= Snub trihexagonal tiling =

Semiregular tiling of the Euclidean plane

Snub trihexagonal tiling
Snub trihexagonal tiling
Type	Semiregular tiling
Vertex configuration	3.3.3.3.6
Schläfli symbol	sr{6,3} or $s\begin{Bmatrix} 6 \\ 3 \end{Bmatrix}$
Wythoff symbol	| 6 3 2
Coxeter diagram	
Symmetry	p6, [6,3]^{+}, (632)
Rotation symmetry	p6, [6,3]^{+}, (632)
Bowers acronym	Snathat
Dual	Floret pentagonal tiling
Properties	Vertex-transitive chiral

In geometry, the snub hexagonal tiling (or snub trihexagonal tiling) is a semiregular tiling of the Euclidean plane. There are four triangles and one hexagon on each vertex. It has Schläfli symbol sr{3,6}. The snub tetrahexagonal tiling is a related hyperbolic tiling with Schläfli symbol sr{4,6}.

Conway calls it a snub hextille, constructed as a snub operation applied to a hexagonal tiling (hextille).

There are three regular and eight semiregular tilings in the plane. This is the only one which does not have a reflection as a symmetry.

There is only one uniform coloring of a snub trihexagonal tiling. (Labeling the colors by numbers, "3.3.3.3.6" gives "11213".)

== Circle packing ==
The snub trihexagonal tiling leads to a circle packing, each vertex becoming the center of a circle of fixed diameter. Every circle is in contact with 5 other circles in the packing (kissing number). The lattice domain (red rhombus) repeats 6 distinct circles. The hexagonal gaps can be filled by exactly one circle, leading to the densest packing from the triangular tiling.

== Related polyhedra and tilings ==
There is one related 2-uniform tiling, which mixes the vertex configurations 3.3.3.3.6 of the snub trihexagonal tiling and 3.3.3.3.3.3 of the triangular tiling.

Uniform hexagonal/triangular tilings
Fundamental domains	Symmetry: [6,3], (*632)							[6,3]^{+}, (632)
Fundamental domains	{6,3}	t{6,3}	r{6,3}	t{3,6}	{3,6}	rr{6,3}	tr{6,3}	sr{6,3}
Config.	6^{3}	3.12.12	(6.3)^{2}	6.6.6	3^{6}	3.4.6.4	4.6.12	3.3.3.3.6

=== Symmetry mutations ===
This semiregular tiling is a member of a sequence of snubbed polyhedra and tilings with vertex figure (3.3.3.3.n) and Coxeter–Dynkin diagram. These figures and their duals have (n32) rotational symmetry, being in the Euclidean plane for n=6, and hyperbolic plane for any higher n. The series can be considered to begin with n=2, with one set of faces degenerated into digons.

n32 symmetry mutations of snub tilings: 3.3.3.3.n
Symmetry n32	Spherical				Euclidean	Compact hyperbolic		Paracomp.
Symmetry n32	232	332	432	532	632	732	832	∞32
Snub figures								
Config.	3.3.3.3.2	3.3.3.3.3	3.3.3.3.4	3.3.3.3.5	3.3.3.3.6	3.3.3.3.7	3.3.3.3.8	3.3.3.3.∞
Gyro figures								
Config.	V3.3.3.3.2	V3.3.3.3.3	V3.3.3.3.4	V3.3.3.3.5	V3.3.3.3.6	V3.3.3.3.7	V3.3.3.3.8	V3.3.3.3.∞

== 6-fold pentille tiling ==
Floret pentagonal tiling
- Type: Dual semiregular tiling
- Wallpaper group: p6, [6,3]^{+}, (632)
- Rotation group: p6, [6,3]^{+}, (632)
- Dual: Snub trihexagonal tiling
- Face configuration: V3.3.3.3.6; Face figure:
- Properties: face-transitive, chiral

In geometry, the 6-fold pentille or floret pentagonal tiling is a dual semiregular tiling of the Euclidean plane. It is one of the 15 known isohedral pentagon tilings. Its six pentagonal tiles radiate out from a central point, like petals on a flower. Each of its pentagonal faces has four 120° and one 60° angle.

It is the dual of the uniform snub trihexagonal tiling, and has rotational symmetries of orders 6-3-2 symmetry.

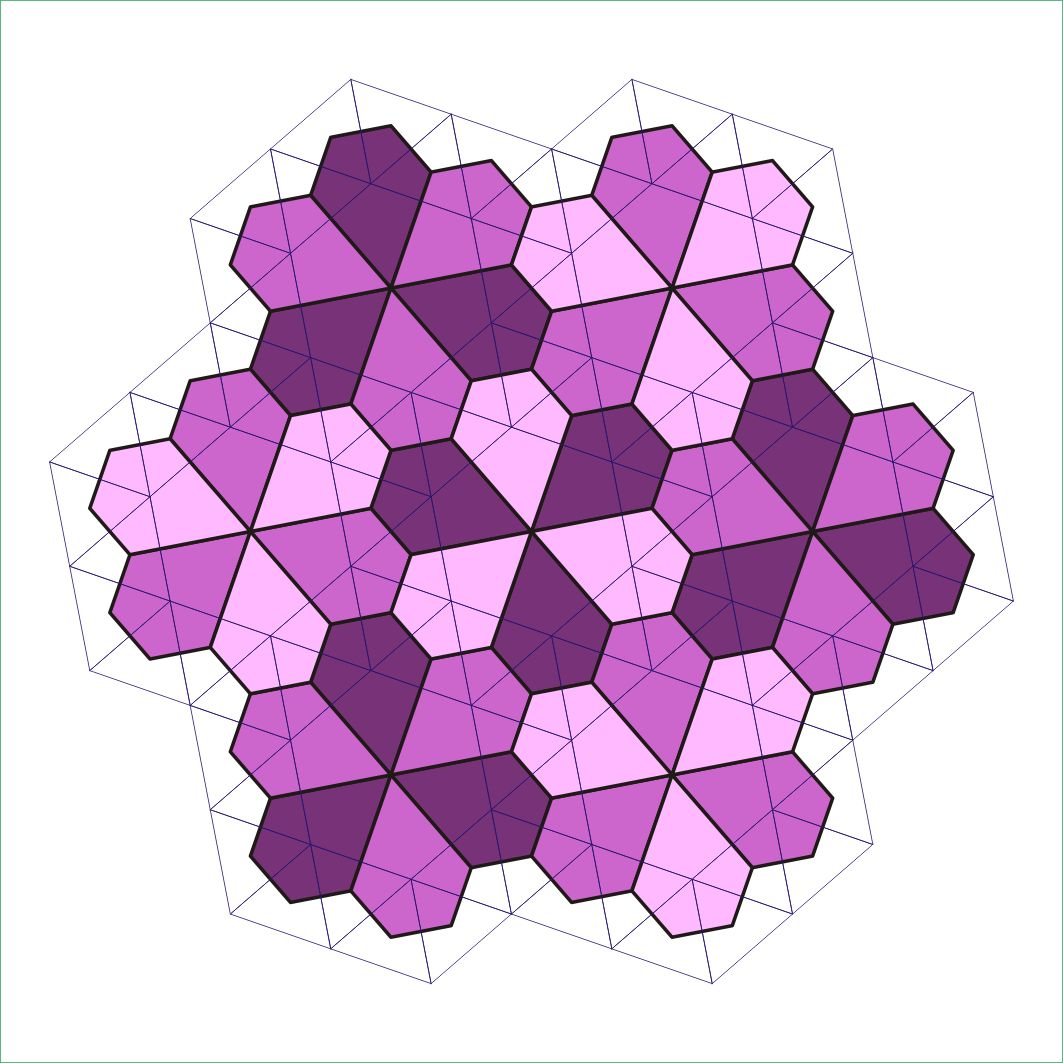

=== Variations ===
The floret pentagonal tiling has geometric variations with unequal edge lengths and rotational symmetry, which is given as monohedral pentagonal tiling type 5. In one limit, an edge-length goes to zero and it becomes a deltoidal trihexagonal tiling.

General	Zero length degenerate	Special cases			
(See animation)	Deltoidal trihexagonal tiling				
a=b, d=e A=60°, D=120°	a=b, d=e, c=0 A=60°, 90°, 90°, D=120°	a=b=2c=2d=2e A=60°, B=C=D=E=120°	a=b=d=e A=60°, D=120°, E=150°	2a=2b=c=2d=2e 0°, A=60°, D=120°	a=b=c=d=e 0°, A=60°, D=120°

=== Related k-uniform and dual k-uniform tilings ===
There are many k-uniform tilings whose duals mix the 6-fold florets with other tiles; for example, labeling F for V3^{4}.6, C for V3^{2}.4.3.4, B for V3^{3}.4^{2}, H for V3^{6}:

uniform (snub trihexagonal)	2-uniform		3-uniform		
F, p6 (t=3, e=3)	FH, p6 (t=5, e=7)	FH, p6m (t=3, e=3)	FCB, p6m (t=5, e=6)	FH^{2}, p6m (t=3, e=4)	FH^{2}, p6m (t=5, e=5)
dual uniform (floret pentagonal)	dual 2-uniform		dual 3-uniform		
3-uniform		4-uniform			
FH^{2}, p6 (t=7, e=9)	F^{2}H, cmm (t=4, e=6)	F^{2}H^{2}, p6 (t=6, e=9)	F^{3}H, p2 (t=7, e=12)	FH^{3}, p6 (t=7, e=10)	FH^{3}, p6m (t=7, e=8)
dual 3-uniform		dual 4-uniform			

=== Fractalization ===
Replacing every V3^{6} hexagon by a rhombitrihexagon furnishes a 6-uniform tiling, two vertices of 4.6.12 and two vertices of 3.4.6.4.

Replacing every V3^{6} hexagon by a truncated hexagon furnishes a 8-uniform tiling, five vertices of 3^{2}.12, two vertices of 3.4.3.12, and one vertex of 3.4.6.4.

Replacing every V3^{6} hexagon by a truncated trihexagon furnishes a 15-uniform tiling, twelve vertices of 4.6.12, two vertices of 3.4^{2}.6, and one vertex of 3.4.6.4.

In each fractal tiling, every vertex in a floret pentagonal domain is in a different orbit since there is no chiral symmetry (the domains have 3:2 side lengths of $1+\frac{1}{\sqrt{3}}:2+\frac{2}{\sqrt{3}}$ in the rhombitrihexagonal; $1+\frac{2}{\sqrt{3}}:2+\frac{4}{\sqrt{3}}$ in the truncated hexagonal; and $1+\sqrt{3}:2+2\sqrt{3}$ in the truncated trihexagonal).

Fractalizing the Snub Trihexagonal Tiling using the Rhombitrihexagonal, Truncated Hexagonal and Truncated Trihexagonal Tilings
Rhombitrihexagonal	Truncated Hexagonal	Truncated Trihexagonal

==== Related tilings ====
Dual uniform hexagonal/triangular tilings
Symmetry: [6,3], (*632)						[6,3]^{+}, (632)
V6^{3}	V3.12^{2}	V(3.6)^{2}	V3^{6}	V3.4.6.4	V.4.6.12	V3^{4}.6

== See also ==
- Tilings of regular polygons
- List of uniform tilings
