= Pentagonal hexecontahedron =

Catalan solid with 60 faces

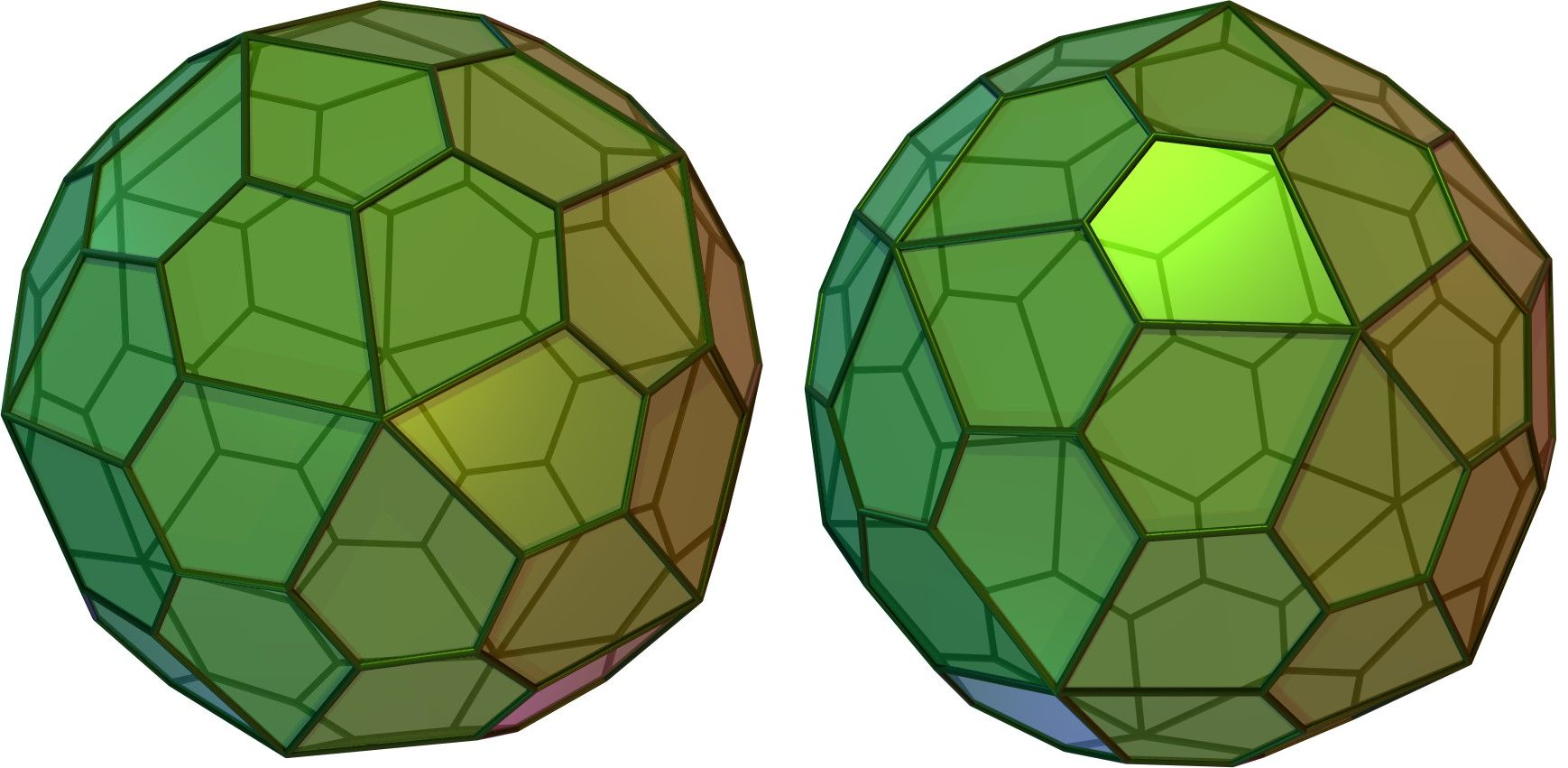
- Type: Catalan solid
- Faces: 60
- Edges: 150
- Vertices: 92
- Symmetry group: icosahedral symmetry
- Dihedral angle (degrees): 153.2°
- Dual polyhedron: snub dodecahedron

Net

In geometry, a pentagonal hexecontahedron is a Catalan solid, dual of the snub dodecahedron. It has two distinct forms, which are mirror images (or "enantiomorphs") of each other. It has 92 vertices that span 60 pentagonal faces. It is the Catalan solid with the most vertices. Among the Catalan and Archimedean solids, it has the second largest number of vertices, after the truncated icosidodecahedron, which has 120 vertices.

== Properties ==
3D model of a pentagonal hexecontahedron

The faces are irregular pentagons with two long edges and three short edges. Let $\xi\approx 0.943\,151\,259\,24$ be the real zero of the polynomial $x^3+2x^2-\phi^2$. Then the ratio $l$ of the edge lengths is given by:
$$l = \frac{1+\xi}{2-\xi^2}\approx 1.749\,852\,566\,74.$$
The faces have four equal obtuse angles and one acute angle (between the two long edges). The obtuse angles equal $\arccos(-\xi/2)\approx 118.136\,622\,758\,62^{\circ}$, and the acute one equals $\arccos(-\phi^2\xi/2+\phi)\approx 67.453\,508\,965\,51^{\circ}$. The dihedral angle equals $\arccos(-\xi/(2-\xi))\approx 153.2^{\circ}$.

Note that the face centers of the snub dodecahedron cannot serve directly as vertices of the pentagonal hexecontahedron: the four triangle centers lie in one plane but the pentagon center does not; it needs to be radially pushed out to make it coplanar with the triangle centers. Consequently, the vertices of the pentagonal hexecontahedron do not all lie on the same sphere and by definition it is not a zonohedron.

To find the volume and surface area of a pentagonal hexecontahedron, denote the shorter side of one of the pentagonal faces as $b$, and set a constant
$$t = \frac{\sqrt[3]{44+12\phi(9+\sqrt{81\phi-15})}+\sqrt[3]{44+12\phi(9-\sqrt{81\phi-15})}-4}{12} \approx 0.472.$$
Then the surface area ($A$) is:
$$A = \frac{30b^2\cdot(2+3t)\cdot\sqrt{1-t^2}}{1-2t^2}\approx162.698b^2.$$
And the volume ($V$) is:
$$V = \frac{5b^3(1+t)(2+3t)}{(1-2t^2)\cdot\sqrt{1-2t}}\approx189.789b^3.$$
Using these, one can calculate the measure of sphericity for this shape:
$$\Psi = \frac{\pi^{\frac{1}{3}}(6V)^{\frac{2}{3}}}{A} \approx 0.982$$

== Construction ==
Combining a unit circumradius icosahedron (12) centered at the origin with a chiral snub dodecahedron (60) combined with a dodecahedron of the same non-unity circumradius (20) to construct the pentagonal hexecontahedron

The pentagonal hexecontahedron can be constructed from a snub dodecahedron without taking the dual. Pentagonal pyramids are added to the 12 pentagonal faces of the snub dodecahedron, and triangular pyramids are added to the 20 triangular faces that do not share an edge with a pentagon. The pyramid heights are adjusted to make them coplanar with the other 60 triangular faces of the snub dodecahedron. The result is the pentagonal hexecontahedron.

An alternate construction method uses quaternions and the icosahedral symmetry of the Weyl group orbits $O(\Lambda)=W(H_3)/C_2 \approx A_5=I$ of order 60. This is shown in the figure on the right.

Specifically, with quaternions from the binary Icosahedral group $(p,q) \in I_h$, where $q=\bar p$ is the conjugate of $p$ and $[p,q]:r\rightarrow r'=prq$ and $[p,q]^*:r\rightarrow r''=p\bar rq$, then just as the Coxeter group $W(H_4)=\lbrace[p,\bar p] \oplus [p,\bar p]^*\rbrace$ is the symmetry group of the 600-cell and the 120-cell of order 14400, we have

$W(H_3)=\lbrace[p,\bar p] \oplus [p,\bar p]^*\rbrace=A_5\times C_2=I_h$

of order 120. $I$ is defined as the even permutations of $I_h$ such that $[I,\bar I]:r$ gives the 60 twisted chiral snub dodecahedron coordinates, where

$r\approx -0.389662 e_1 + 0.267979 e_2 -0.881108 e_3$

is one permutation from the first set of 12 in those listed above. The exact coordinate for $r$ is obtained by taking the solution to $x^3-x^2-x-\phi=0$, with $x\approx 1.94315$, and applying it to the normalization of

$r=(-1+x^2(-1-2/\phi-x\phi)e_1 + (3-x^2+3x\phi)e_2 + ((x^3-1/\phi)\phi^3)e_3.$

=== Cartesian coordinates ===
Using the Icosahedral symmetry in the orbits of the Weyl group $O(\Lambda)=W(H_3)/C_2 \approx A_5$of order 60 gives the following Cartesian coordinates with $\phi=\frac{1+\sqrt{5}}{2}$ is the golden ratio:

- Twelve vertices of a regular icosahedron with unit circumradius centered at the origin with the coordinates
  $$\frac{(0, \pm 1, \pm \phi)}{\sqrt{\phi^2 + 1}}       ,        \frac{(\pm 1, \pm \phi, 0)}{\sqrt{\phi^2 + 1}}       ,        \frac{(\pm \phi, 0, \pm 1)}{\sqrt{\phi^2 + 1}}.$$
- Twenty vertices of regular dodecahedron of unit circumradius centered at the origin scaled by a factor $R\approx 0.95369785218$ from an exact root of the polynomial

$700569 - 1795770 x^2 + 1502955 x^4 - 423900 x^6 + 14175 x^8 - 2250 x^{10} + 125 x^{12} = 0,$ which gives the coordinates
$$(\pm 1, \pm 1,\pm 1)\frac{R}{\sqrt{3}}$$
and
$$(0, \pm \phi, \pm \frac{1}{\phi})\frac{R}{\sqrt{3}} , (\pm \frac{1}{\phi}, 0 , \pm \phi) \frac{R}{\sqrt{3}} ,  (\pm \phi, \pm \frac{1}{\phi},0)\frac{R}{\sqrt{3}}.$$

- Sixty vertices of a unit-circumradius chiral snub dodecahedron scaled by $R$. There are five sets of twelve vertices, all with even permutations (i.e. with a parity signature=1).

A group of two sets of twelve have 0 or 2 minus signs (i.e. 1 or 3 plus signs):
$$(\pm 0.267979, \pm 0.881108, \pm 0.389662) R ,$$
$$(\pm 0.721510, \pm 0.600810, \pm 0.344167) R ,$$
and another group of three sets of 12 have 0 or 2 plus signs (i.e. 1 or 3 minus signs):
$$(\pm 0.176956, \pm 0.824852, \pm 0.536941) R ,$$
$$(\pm 0.435190, \pm0.777765,  \pm 0.453531) R ,$$
$$(\pm 0.990472, \pm 0.103342, \pm 0.091023) R .$$
Negating all vertices in both groups gives the mirror of the chiral snub dodecahedron, yet results in the same pentagonal hexecontahedron convex hull.

== Variations ==
Isohedral variations can be constructed with pentagonal faces with 3 edge lengths.

This variation shown can be constructed by adding pyramids to 12 pentagonal faces and 20 triangular faces of a snub dodecahedron such that the new triangular faces are coparallel to other triangles and can be merged into the pentagon faces.

Snub dodecahedron with augmented pyramids and merged faces	Example variation	Net

== Orthogonal projections ==
The pentagonal hexecontahedron has three symmetry positions, two on vertices, and one mid-edge.

Orthogonal projections
Projective symmetry	[3]	[5]^{+}	[2]
Image			
Dual image			

== Related polyhedra and tilings ==
Spherical pentagonal hexecontahedron

Family of uniform icosahedral polyhedra
Symmetry: [5,3], (*532)							[5,3]^{+}, (532)
{5,3}	t{5,3}	r{5,3}	t{3,5}	{3,5}	rr{5,3}	tr{5,3}	sr{5,3}
Duals to uniform polyhedra
V5.5.5	V3.10.10	V3.5.3.5	V5.6.6	V3.3.3.3.3	V3.4.5.4	V4.6.10	V3.3.3.3.5

This polyhedron is topologically related as a part of sequence of polyhedra and tilings of pentagons with face configurations (V3.3.3.3.n). (The sequence progresses into tilings the hyperbolic plane to any n.) These face-transitive figures have (n32) rotational symmetry.

n32 symmetry mutations of snub tilings: 3.3.3.3.n
Symmetry n32	Spherical				Euclidean	Compact hyperbolic		Paracomp.
Symmetry n32	232	332	432	532	632	732	832	∞32
Snub figures								
Config.	3.3.3.3.2	3.3.3.3.3	3.3.3.3.4	3.3.3.3.5	3.3.3.3.6	3.3.3.3.7	3.3.3.3.8	3.3.3.3.∞
Gyro figures								
Config.	V3.3.3.3.2	V3.3.3.3.3	V3.3.3.3.4	V3.3.3.3.5	V3.3.3.3.6	V3.3.3.3.7	V3.3.3.3.8	V3.3.3.3.∞

== See also ==
- Truncated pentagonal hexecontahedron
- Amazon Spheres
