= Pentagonal icositetrahedron =

Catalan solid with 24 faces

Pentagonal icositetrahedron
Type	Catalan
Conway notation	gC
Coxeter diagram	
Face polygon	irregular pentagon
Faces	24
Edges	60
Vertices	38 = 6 + 8 + 24
Face configuration	V3.3.3.3.4
Dihedral angle	136° 18' 33'
Symmetry group	O, 1/2BC_{3}, [4,3]^{+}, 432
Dual polyhedron	snub cube
Properties	convex, face-transitive, chiral
Net of a dextro form

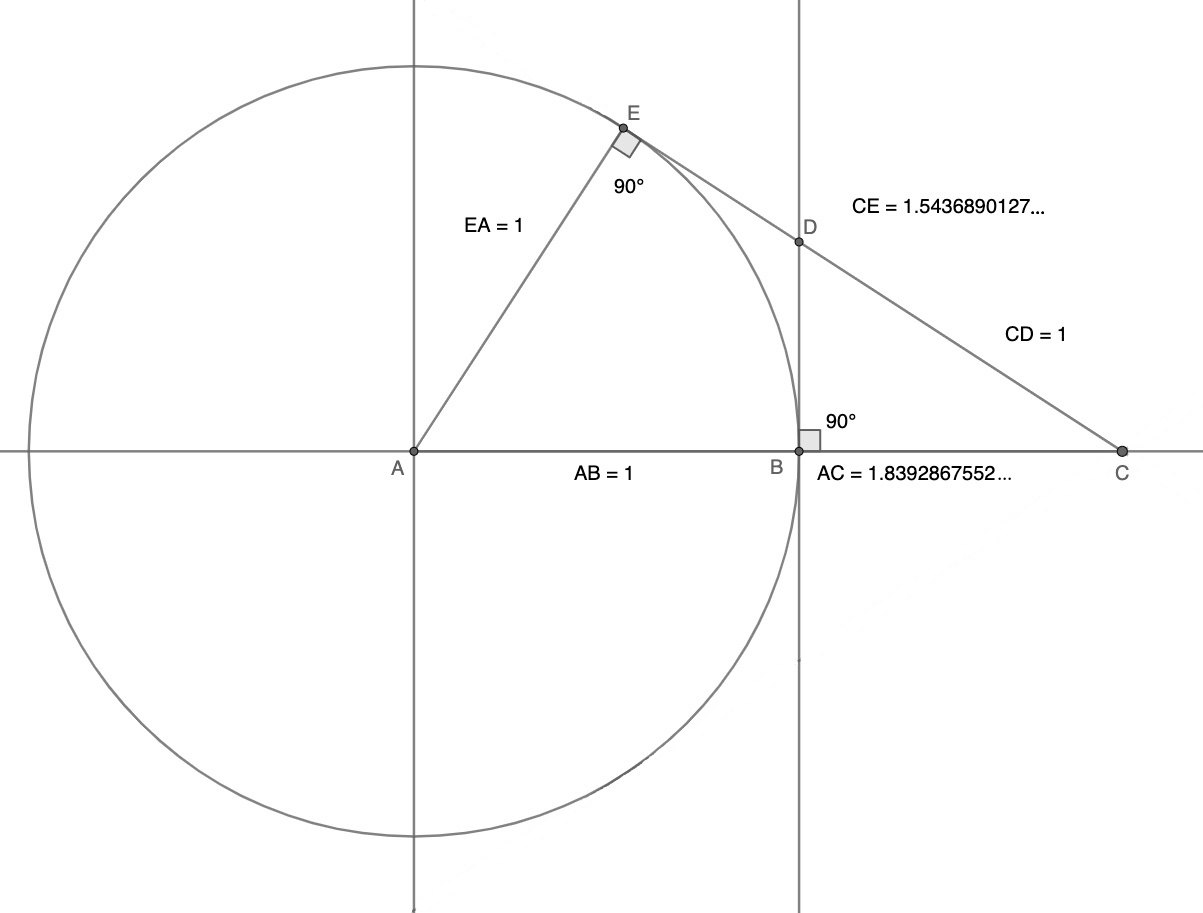
A geometric construction of the Tribonacci constant (AC), with compass and marked ruler, according to the method described by Xerardo Neira.

3d model of a pentagonal icositetrahedron

In geometry, a pentagonal icositetrahedron or pentagonal icosikaitetrahedron is a Catalan solid which is the dual of the snub cube. In crystallography it is also called a gyroid.

It has two distinct forms, which are mirror images (or "enantiomorphs") of each other. They are termed dextro and laevo forms.

== Construction ==
The pentagonal icositetrahedron can be constructed from a snub cube without taking the dual. Square pyramids are added to the six square faces of the snub cube, and triangular pyramids are added to the eight triangular faces that do not share an edge with a square. The pyramid heights are adjusted to make them coplanar with the other 24 triangular faces of the snub cube. The result is the pentagonal icositetrahedron.

== Cartesian coordinates ==
Denote the tribonacci constant by $t\approx 1.839\,286\,755\,21$. (See snub cube for a geometric explanation of the tribonacci constant.) Then Cartesian coordinates for the 38 vertices of a pentagonal icositetrahedron centered at the origin, are as follows:

- the 12 even permutations of (±1, ±(2t+1), ±t^{2}) with an even number of minus signs
- the 12 odd permutations of (±1, ±(2t+1), ±t^{2}) with an odd number of minus signs
- the 6 points (±t^{3}, 0, 0), (0, ±t^{3}, 0) and (0, 0, ±t^{3})
- the 8 points (±t^{2}, ±t^{2}, ±t^{2})

The convex hulls for these vertices scaled by $t^{-3}$ result in a unit circumradius octahedron centered at the origin, a unit cube centered at the origin scaled to $R\approx0.9416969935$, and an irregular chiral snub cube scaled to $R$, as visualized in the figure below:

== Geometry ==
The pentagonal faces have four angles of $\arccos((1-t)/2)\approx 114.812\,074\,477\,90^{\circ}$ and one angle of $\arccos(2-t)\approx 80.751\,702\,088\,39^{\circ}$. The pentagon has three short edges of unit length each, and two long edges of length $(t+1)/2\approx 1.419\,643\,377\,607\,08$. The acute angle is between the two long edges. The dihedral angle equals $\arccos(-1/(t^2-2))\approx 136.309\,232\,892\,32^{\circ}$.

If its dual snub cube has unit edge length, its surface area and volume are:

$$\begin{align} A &= 3\sqrt{\frac{22(5t-1)}{4t-3}} &&\approx 19.299\,94 \\ V &= \sqrt{\frac{11(t-4)}{2(20t-37)}} &&\approx 7.4474 \end{align}$$

== Orthogonal projections ==
The pentagonal icositetrahedron has three symmetry positions, two centered on vertices, and one on midedge.

Orthogonal projections
Projective symmetry	[3]	[4]^{+}	[2]
Image			
Dual image			

=== Variations ===
Isohedral variations with the same chiral octahedral symmetry can be constructed with pentagonal faces having 3 edge lengths.

This variation shown can be constructed by adding pyramids to 6 square faces and 8 triangular faces of a snub cube such that the new triangular faces with 3 coplanar triangles merged into identical pentagon faces.

Snub cube with augmented pyramids and merged faces	Pentagonal icositetrahedron	Net

Among the variations mentioned above, Scott Sherman reported another case in which the pentagonal faces are bilaterally symmetrical in 2014. He called it the Bilateral Pentagonal Icositetrahedron. In 2020, Tadaki Takahashi provided a geometric proof for this solid, naming it the Shogihedron because the shape of its faces resembles the pieces in the Japanese board game Shogi.

Shogihedron	Shogihedron-net

== Related polyhedra and tilings ==
Spherical pentagonal icositetrahedron

This polyhedron is topologically related as a part of sequence of polyhedra and tilings of pentagons with face configurations (V3.3.3.3.n). (The sequence progresses into tilings the hyperbolic plane to any n.) These face-transitive figures have (n32) rotational symmetry.

n32 symmetry mutations of snub tilings: 3.3.3.3.n
Symmetry n32	Spherical				Euclidean	Compact hyperbolic		Paracomp.
Symmetry n32	232	332	432	532	632	732	832	∞32
Snub figures								
Config.	3.3.3.3.2	3.3.3.3.3	3.3.3.3.4	3.3.3.3.5	3.3.3.3.6	3.3.3.3.7	3.3.3.3.8	3.3.3.3.∞
Gyro figures								
Config.	V3.3.3.3.2	V3.3.3.3.3	V3.3.3.3.4	V3.3.3.3.5	V3.3.3.3.6	V3.3.3.3.7	V3.3.3.3.8	V3.3.3.3.∞

The pentagonal icositetrahedron is second in a series of dual snub polyhedra and tilings with face configuration V3.3.4.3.n.

4n2 symmetry mutations of snub tilings: 3.3.4.3.n
Symmetry 4n2	Spherical		Euclidean	Compact hyperbolic				Paracomp.
Symmetry 4n2	242	342	442	542	642	742	842	∞42
Snub figures								
Config.	3.3.4.3.2	3.3.4.3.3	3.3.4.3.4	3.3.4.3.5	3.3.4.3.6	3.3.4.3.7	3.3.4.3.8	3.3.4.3.∞
Gyro figures								
Config.	V3.3.4.3.2	V3.3.4.3.3	V3.3.4.3.4	V3.3.4.3.5	V3.3.4.3.6	V3.3.4.3.7	V3.3.4.3.8	V3.3.4.3.∞

The pentagonal icositetrahedron is one of a family of duals to the uniform polyhedra related to the cube and regular octahedron.

Uniform octahedral polyhedra
Symmetry: [4,3], (*432)							[4,3]^{+} (432)	[1^{+},4,3] = [3,3] (*332)		[3^{+},4] (3*2)
{4,3}	t{4,3}	r{4,3} r{3^{1,1}}	t{3,4} t{3^{1,1}}	{3,4} {3^{1,1}}	rr{4,3} s_{2}{3,4}	tr{4,3}	sr{4,3}	h{4,3} {3,3}	h_{2}{4,3} t{3,3}	s{3,4} s{3^{1,1}}
		=	=	=				= or	= or	=
Duals to uniform polyhedra
V4^{3}	V3.8^{2}	V(3.4)^{2}	V4.6^{2}	V3^{4}	V3.4^{3}	V4.6.8	V3^{4}.4	V3^{3}	V3.6^{2}	V3^{5}
