= Snub octahedron =

Regular icosahedron

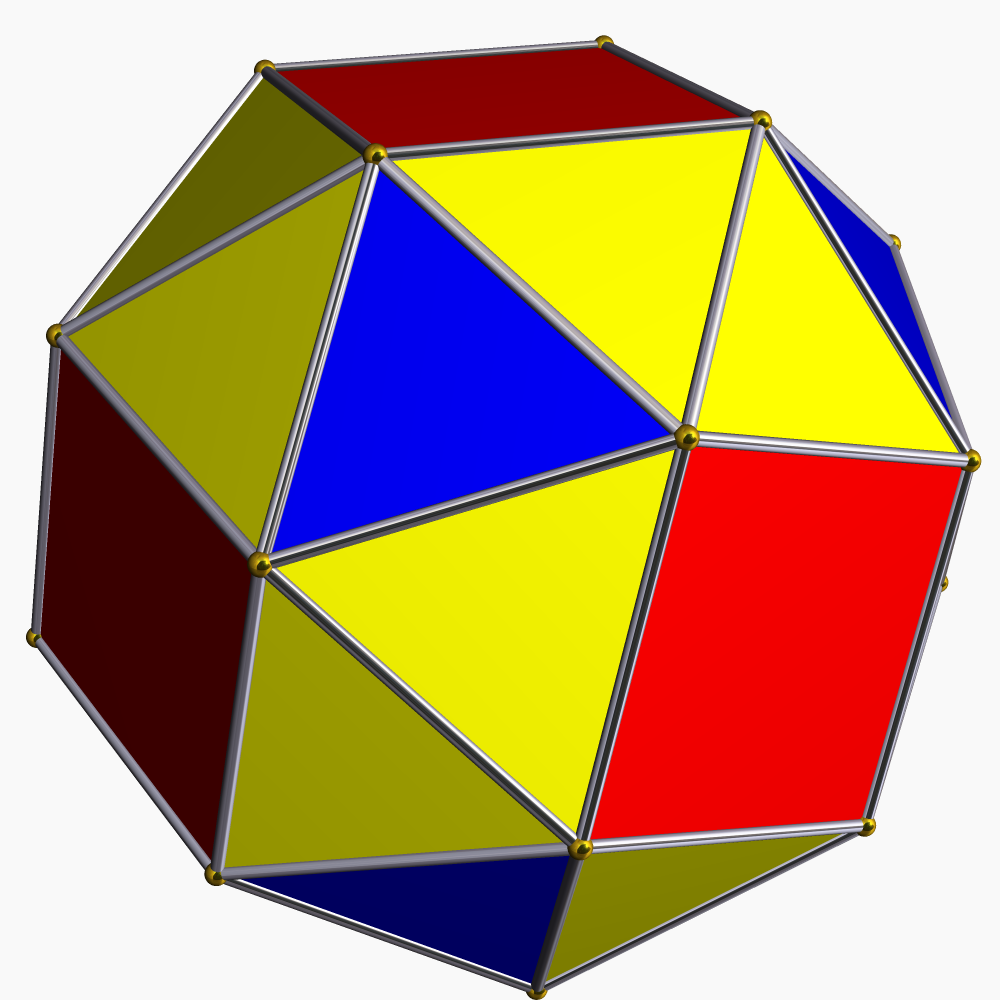
Snub cube

Snub octahedron may refer to:

- Regular icosahedron
- Snub cube, or snub cuboctahedron
