= Truncated cube =

Archimedean solid with 14 faces

- Type: Archimedean solid
- Faces: 14 (6 octagons and 8 triangles
- Edges: 36
- Vertices: 24
- Symmetry group: octahedral symmetry $\mathrm{O}_h$
- Dual polyhedron: triakis octahedron

Vertex figure

Net

In geometry, the truncated cube, or truncated hexahedron, is an Archimedean solid. It has 14 regular faces (6 octagonal and 8 triangular), 36 edges, and 24 vertices.

If the truncated cube has unit edge length, its dual triakis octahedron has edges of lengths 2 and δ_{S} +1, where δ_{S} is the silver ratio, √2 +1.

== Construction ==
The truncated cube is constructed by cutting off all the vertices of a cube. The resulting polyhedron has six octagons and eight triangles, having in total fourteen regular polygonal faces, thirty-six edges, and twenty-four vertices.

Cartesian coordinates for the vertices of a truncated cube centered at the origin with edge length $2 \frac{1}{\delta_S}$ are all the permutations of
$$\left( \pm \frac{1}{\delta_S}, \pm 1, \pm 1 \right),$$
where $\delta_S = 1 + \sqrt{2}$ is a silver ratio.

== Properties ==
3D model of a truncated cube

The truncated cube is an Archimedean solid, a highly symmetric and semi-regular polyhedron with two or more different regular polygonal faces that meet in a vertex. Every vertex is surrounded by two octagons and one triangle, thereby the vertex figure is $3 \cdot 8^2$. The truncated octahedron has the same three-dimensional symmetry group as the regular octahedron does, the octahedral symmetry $\mathrm{O}_\mathrm{h}$. The dual polyhedron of a truncated cube is a triakis octahedron, a Catalan solid obtained by gluing two short pyramids onto the faces of a regular octahedron.

To find the surface area of a truncated cube, one may calculate the total area of all polygonal faces, namely six regular octagons and eight equilateral triangles, all of which have the same edge length. On the other hand, its volume can be calculated from the volume of a cube and the volume of the smaller pieces that have been truncated, and then subtracting them. Let $a$ be the edge length of a truncated cube. The formulation for its surface area $A$ and the volume $V$ are:
$$\begin{align}
A &= 2\left(6+6\sqrt{2}+\sqrt{3}\right)a^2 &&\approx 32.435a^2 \\
V &= \frac{21+14\sqrt{2}}{3}a^3 &&\approx 13.600a^3.
\end{align}$$

A truncated cube has two different dihedral angles, an angle between two polygonal faces: An angle between a triangle and an octagon is 125.26°, whereas an angle between two octagons is a right angle, 90°.

== Dissection ==
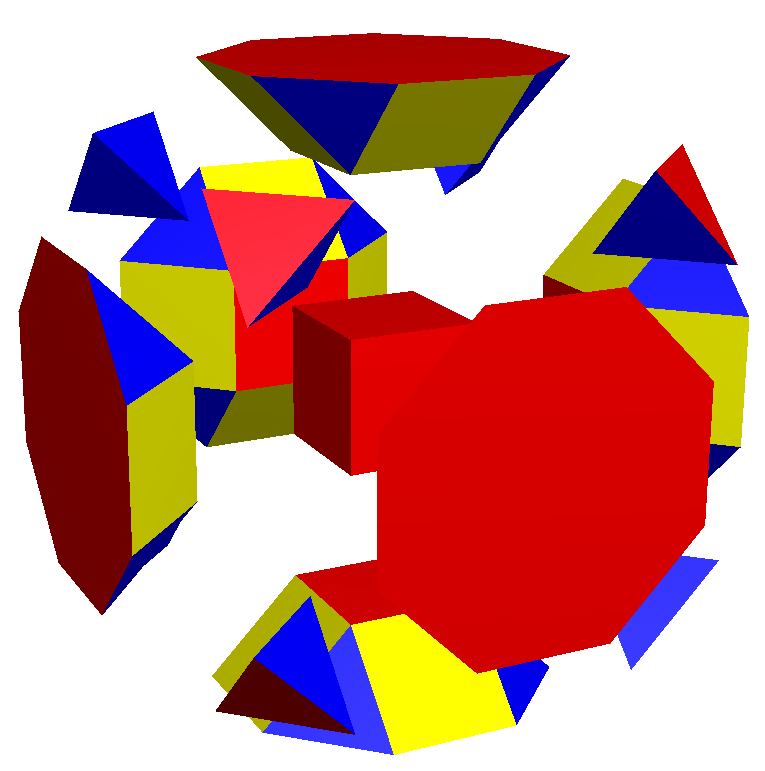
Dissected truncated cube, with elements expanded apart

The truncated cube can be dissected into a central cube, with six square cupolae around each of the cube's faces, and 8 regular tetrahedra in the corners. This dissection can also be seen within the runcic cubic honeycomb, with cube, tetrahedron, and rhombicuboctahedron cells.

This dissection can be used to create a Stewart toroid with all regular faces by removing two square cupolae and the central cube. This excavated cube has 16 triangles, 12 squares, and 4 octagons.

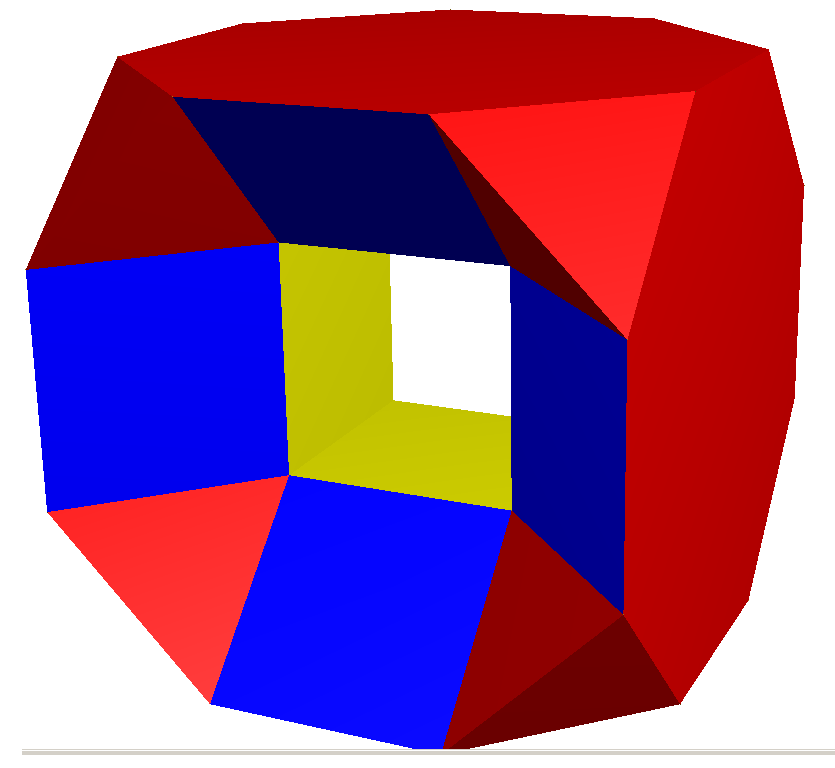

== Graph ==
Graph of a truncated cube

In the mathematical field of graph theory, a truncated cubical graph is the graph of vertices and edges of the truncated cube, one of the Archimedean solids. It has 24 vertices and 36 edges, and is a cubic Archimedean graph. As a Hamiltonian cubic graph, it can be represented by LCF notation as LCF[2,-9,-2,2,9,-2]^{4}.

Orthographic
LCF[2,-9,-2,2,9,-2]^{4}

Configuration
| \ | v_{1} | v_{2} | e_{1} | e_{2} | e_{3} | e_{4} |
| v_{1} | 16 | * | 1 | 1 | 1 | 0 |
| v_{2} | * | 8 | 2 | 0 | 0 | 1 |
| e_{1} | 1 | 1 | 16 | * | * | * |
| e_{2} | 2 | 0 | * | 8 | * | * |
| e_{3} | 2 | 0 | * | * | 8 | * |
| e_{4} | 0 | 2 | * | * | * | 4 |

== See also ==
- Cube-connected cycles, a family of graphs that includes the skeleton of the truncated cube
- Chamfered cube, obtained by replacing the edges of a cube with non-uniform hexagons
