= Archimedean graph =

Graph with an Archimedean solid as its skeleton

In the mathematical field of graph theory, an Archimedean graph is a graph that forms the skeleton of one of the Archimedean solids. There are 13 Archimedean graphs, and all of them are regular, polyhedral (and therefore by necessity also 3-vertex-connected planar graphs), and also Hamiltonian graphs.

Along with the 13, the infinite sets of prism graphs and antiprism graphs can also be considered Archimedean graphs.

Graph elements
| Name | Graph | Degree | Edges | Vertices | Automorphisms |
|---|---|---|---|---|---|
| truncated tetrahedral graph | | 3 | 18 | 12 | 24 |
| cuboctahedral graph | | 4 | 24 | 12 | 48 |
| truncated cubical graph | | 3 | 36 | 24 | 48 |
| truncated octahedral graph | | 3 | 36 | 24 | 48 |
| rhombicuboctahedral graph | | 4 | 48 | 24 | 48 |
| truncated cuboctahedral graph (great rhombicuboctahedron) | | 3 | 72 | 48 | 48 |
| snub cubical graph | | 5 | 60 | 24 | 24 |
| icosidodecahedral graph | | 4 | 60 | 30 | 120 |
| truncated dodecahedral graph | | 3 | 90 | 60 | 120 |
| truncated icosahedral graph | | 3 | 90 | 60 | 120 |
| rhombicosidodecahedral graph | | 4 | 120 | 60 | 120 |
| truncated icosidodecahedral graph (great rhombicosidodecahedron) | | 3 | 180 | 120 | 120 |
| snub dodecahedral graph | | 5 | 150 | 60 | 60 |

== See also ==
- Platonic graph
- Wheel graph
