= Catalan solid =

13 polyhedra; duals of the Archimedean solids

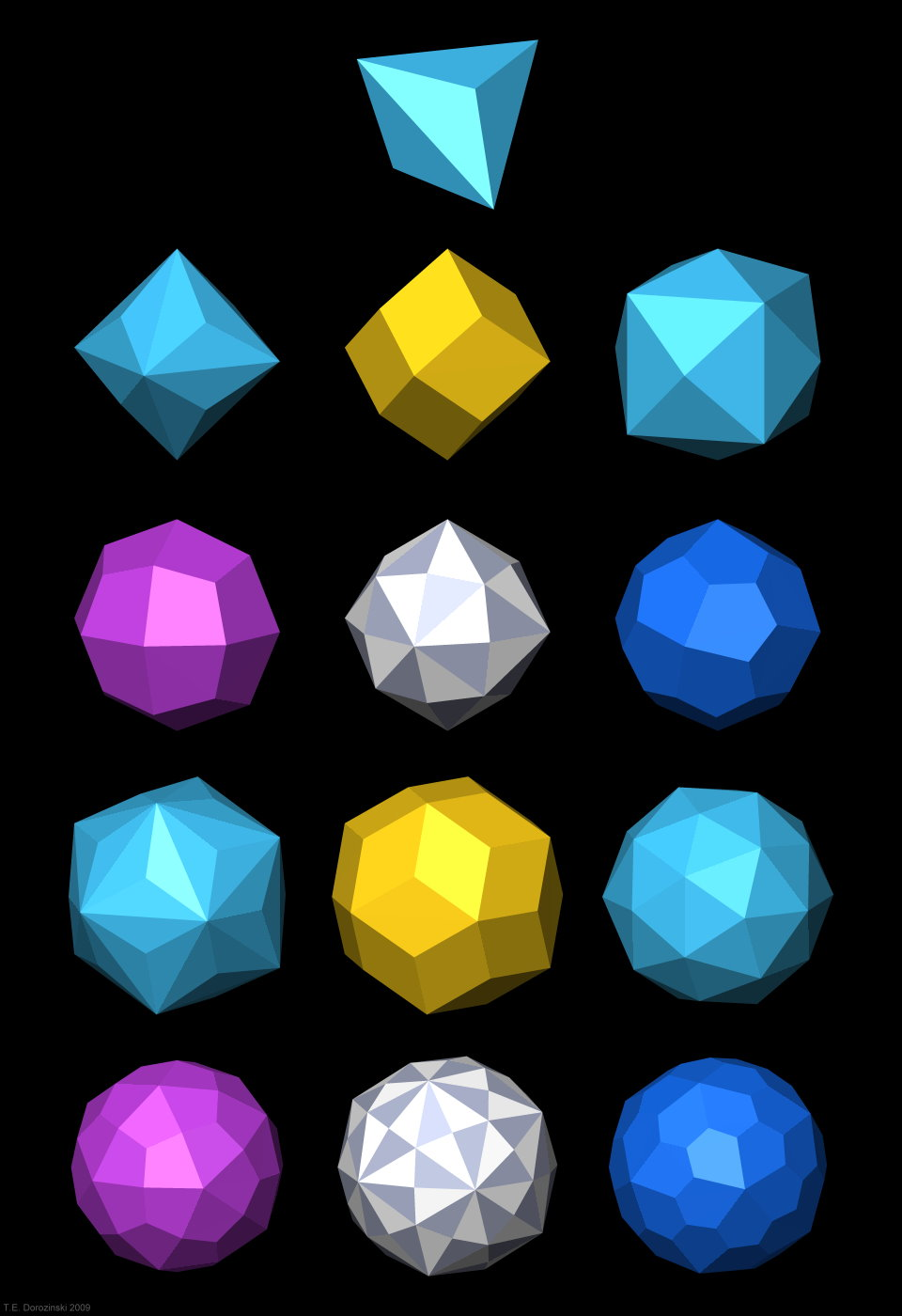
Set of Catalan solids

The Catalan solids are the dual polyhedra of the Archimedean solids. The Archimedean solids are thirteen highly-symmetric polyhedra with regular faces and symmetric vertices. The faces of the Catalan solids correspond by duality to the vertices of Archimedean solids, and vice versa.

== Description ==
The Catalan solids are face-transitive or isohedral, meaning that their faces are symmetric to one another, but they are not vertex-transitive because their vertices are not symmetric. Their duals, the Archimedean solids, are vertex-transitive but not face-transitive. Each Catalan solid has constant dihedral angles, meaning the angle between any two adjacent faces is the same. Additionally, two Catalan solids, the rhombic dodecahedron and rhombic triacontahedron, are edge-transitive, meaning their edges are symmetric to each other. Some Catalan solids were discovered by Johannes Kepler during his study of zonohedra, and Eugène Charles Catalan completed the list of the thirteen solids in 1865.

The rhombic dodecahedron's construction, the dual polyhedron of a cuboctahedron, by Dorman Luke construction

In general, each face of a dual uniform polyhedron (including the Catalan solid) can be constructed by using the Dorman Luke construction. Some of the Catalan solids can be constructed by adding pyramids to the faces of Platonic solids. These examples are Kleetopes of Platonic solids: triakis tetrahedron, tetrakis hexahedron, triakis octahedron, triakis icosahedron, and pentakis dodecahedron.

Two Catalan solids, the pentagonal icositetrahedron and the pentagonal hexecontahedron, are chiral, meaning that these two solids are not their own mirror images. They are dual to the snub cube and snub dodecahedron, respectively, which are also chiral.

Eleven of the thirteen Catalan solids are known to have the Rupert property, which means that a copy of the same solid can be passed through a hole in the solid.

The thirteen Catalan solids
Name	Image	Faces	Edges	Vertices	Dihedral angle (exact)	Dihedral angle (approx.)	Point group
Triakis tetrahedron	Triakis tetrahedron	12 isosceles triangles	18	8	$\arccos(-\frac{7}{11})$	129.521°	T_{d}
Rhombic dodecahedron	Rhombic dodecahedron	12 rhombi	24	14	$\frac{2{\pi}}{3}$	120°	O_{h}
Triakis octahedron	Triakis octahedron	24 isosceles triangles	36	14	$\arccos(-\frac{3+8\sqrt{2}}{17})$	147.350°	O_{h}
Tetrakis hexahedron	Tetrakis hexahedron	24 isosceles triangles	36	14	$\arccos(-\frac{4}{5})$	143.130°	O_{h}
Deltoidal icositetrahedron	Deltoidal icositetrahedron	24 kites	48	26	$\arccos(-\frac{7+4\sqrt{2}}{17})$	138.118°	O_{h}
Disdyakis dodecahedron	Disdyakis dodecahedron	48 scalene triangles	72	26	$\arccos(-\frac{71+12\sqrt{2}}{97})$	155.082°	O_{h}
Pentagonal icositetrahedron	Pentagonal icositetrahedron (Ccw)	24 pentagons	60	38	$\arccos\left(-\frac{1}{t^2 - 2}\right)$ (Note: $t = \frac{1 + \sqrt[3]{19 + 3\sqrt{33}} + \sqrt[3]{19 - 3\sqrt{33}}}{3}$)	136.309°	O
Rhombic triacontahedron	Rhombic triacontahedron	30 rhombi	60	32	$\frac{4{\pi}}{5}$	144°	I_{h}
Triakis icosahedron	Triakis icosahedron	60 isosceles triangles	90	32	$\arccos(-\frac{24+15\sqrt{5}}{61})$	160.613°	I_{h}
Pentakis dodecahedron	Pentakis dodecahedron	60 isosceles triangles	90	32	$\arccos(-\frac{80+9\sqrt{5}}{109})$	156.719°	I_{h}
Deltoidal hexecontahedron	Deltoidal hexecontahedron	60 kites	120	62	$\arccos(-\frac{19+8\sqrt{5}}{41})$	154.121°	I_{h}
Disdyakis triacontahedron	Disdyakis triacontahedron	120 scalene triangles	180	62	$\arccos(-\frac{179+24\sqrt{5}}{241})$	164.888°	I_{h}
Pentagonal hexecontahedron	Pentagonal hexecontahedron (Ccw)	60 pentagons	150	92	$\arccos\left(-\frac{2\left(x + \frac{2}{x}\right)(1 + 15\phi) + 15 + 16\phi}{209}\right)$ (Note: $\phi = \frac{1 + \sqrt{5}}{2}$ and $x = \sqrt[3]{\frac{\phi + \sqrt{\phi - \frac{5}{27}}}{2}} + \sqrt[3]{\frac{\phi - \sqrt{\phi - \frac{5}{27}}}{2}}$)	153.179°	I
