= Triakis octahedron =

Catalan solid with 24 faces

- Type: Kleetope, Catalan solid
- Faces: 24 isosceles triangles
- Edges: 32
- Vertices: 14
- Symmetry group: octahedral group
- Dual polyhedron: truncated cube

Net
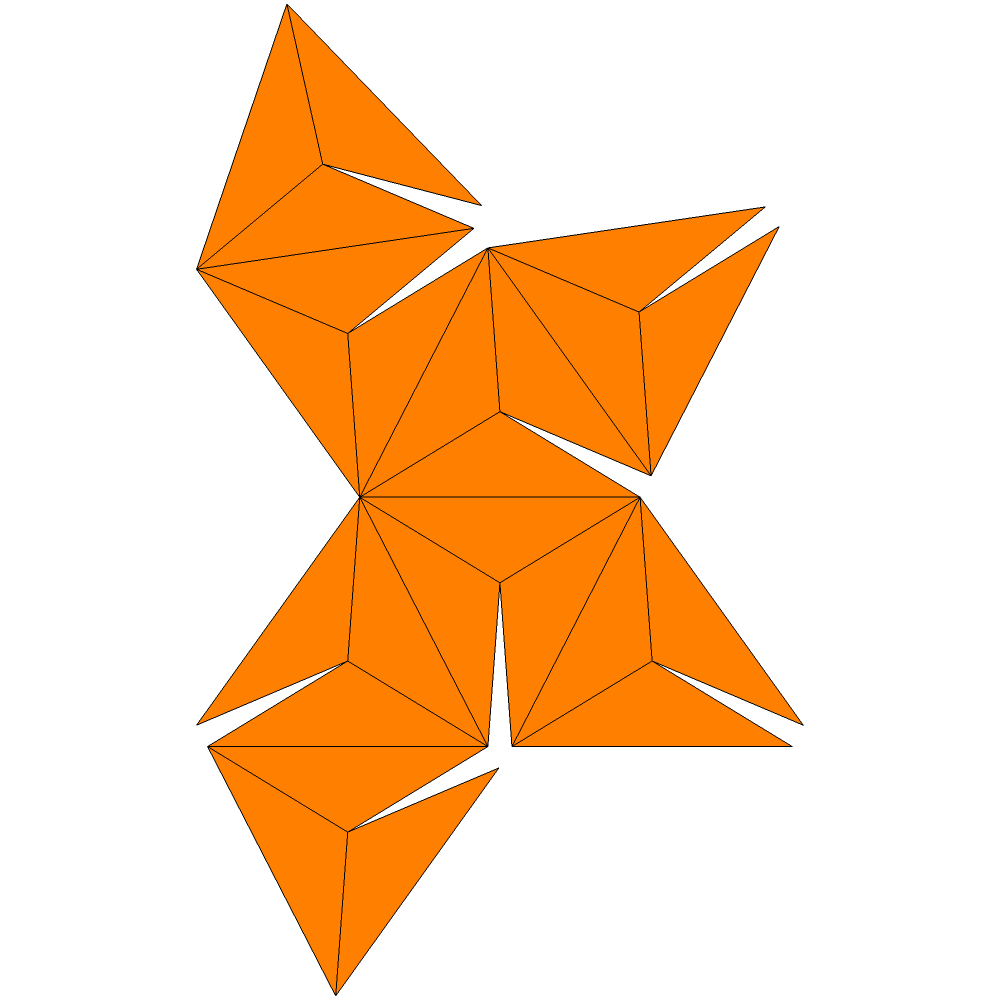

In geometry, a triakis octahedron is an Archimedean dual solid, or a Catalan solid. Its dual is the truncated cube. Some sources nomenclature the polyhedron a trigonal trisoctahedron a kisoctahedron, a trisoctahedron or its full name trigonal trisoctahedron. The last both names reflect that it has three triangular faces for every face of an octahedron. The tetragonal trisoctahedron is another name for the deltoidal icositetrahedron, a different polyhedron with three quadrilateral faces for every face of an octahedron.

== As a Kleetope ==
The triakis octahedron is interpretable as a regular octahedron by overlying each face with a triangular pyramid. A regular octahedron has eight equilateral triangles, so eight congruent tetrahedra cover and replace them with 24 isosceles triangular faces. The process is known as the Kleetope of an octahedron. Such eight tetrahedra can result in convex or non-convex. If the result is latter, it is topologically similar to the concave stellated octahedron, a 24 equilateral triangular faces non-convex deltahedron. Both have the same face connectivity, but only the vertices that are at different relative distances from the center.

The 24 isosceles triangles bring 32 edges and 14 vertices in total. Each isosceles triangle has one vertex of degree 3, with obtuse angles, and two vertices of degree 8, with acute angles. By the notation of face configuration it is $V3.8^2$. The obtuse angle equals
$$\arccos \left(\frac{1}{4} - \frac{\sqrt{2}}{2}\right) \approx 117.2^\circ$$
and the acute ones equal
$$\arccos\left(\frac{1}{2} + \frac{\sqrt{2}}{4}\right) \approx  31.4^\circ.$$
Any two of its adjacent faces form a dihedral angle
$$\arccos \left(-\frac{3 + 8\sqrt{2}}{17}\right) \approx 147.35 ^\circ.$$

== As a Catalan solid ==
3D model of a triakis octahedron

The triakis octahedron is a Catalan solid, the dual of Archimedean solid, a truncated cube. The vertices of a triakis octahedron have the same number of the faces of a truncated cube, and vice versa. Both have a common symmetry as the regular octahedron, known as the octahedral group.

== Cultural references ==
A triakis octahedron is a vital element in the plot of cult author Hugh Cook's novel The Wishstone and the Wonderworkers.

== Related topics ==
The triakis octahedron is also a part of a sequence of polyhedra and tilings, extending into the hyperbolic plane. These face-transitive figures have (*n42) reflectional symmetry.

*n42 symmetry mutation of truncated tilings: n.8.8
| Symmetry *n42 [n,4] | Spherical | | Euclidean | Compact hyperbolic | | | | Paracompact |
| Symmetry *n42 [n,4] | *242 [2,4] | *342 [3,4] | *442 [4,4] | *542 [5,4] | *642 [6,4] | *742 [7,4] | *842 [8,4]... | *∞42 [∞,4] |
|---|---|---|---|---|---|---|---|---|
| Truncated figures | | | | | | | | |
| Config. | 2.8.8 | 3.8.8 | 4.8.8 | 5.8.8 | 6.8.8 | 7.8.8 | 8.8.8 | ∞.8.8 |
| n-kis figures | | | | | | | | |
| Config. | V2.8.8 | V3.8.8 | V4.8.8 | V5.8.8 | V6.8.8 | V7.8.8 | V8.8.8 | V∞.8.8 |
