= Snub dodecahedron =

Archimedean solid with 92 faces

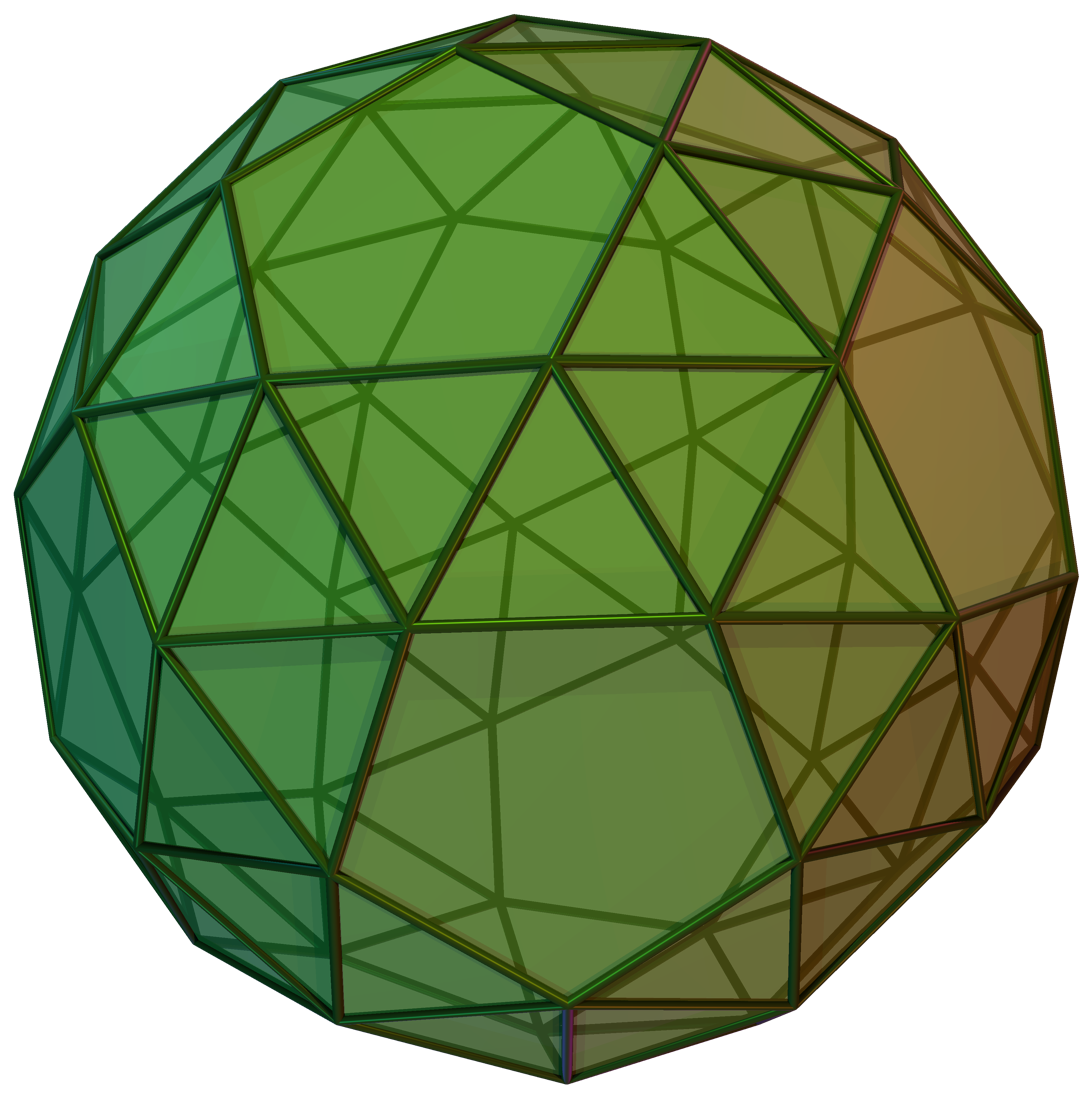
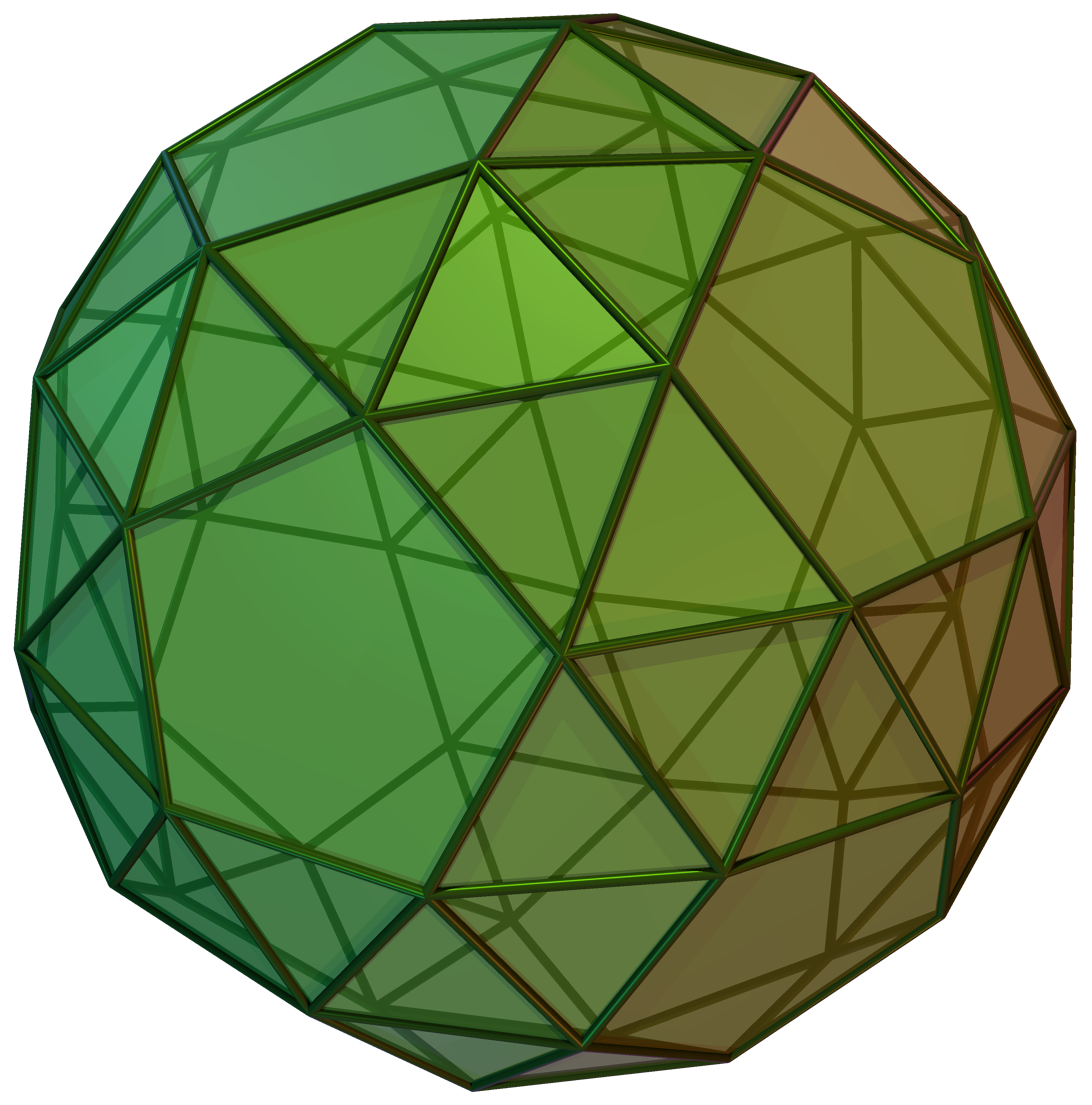
- Snub dodecahedron, left-chiral and right-chiral
- Type: Archimedean solid
- Faces: 92 faces: 12 pentagons and 80 equilateral triangles
- Edges: 150
- Vertices: 60
- Properties: chiral

Net

3D model of a snub dodecahedron

In geometry, the snub dodecahedron, or snub icosidodecahedron, is an Archimedean solid, one of thirteen convex isogonal nonprismatic solids constructed by two or more types of regular polygon faces.

The snub dodecahedron has 92 faces (the most of the 13 Archimedean solids): 12 are pentagons and the other 80 are equilateral triangles. It also has 150 edges and 60 vertices.

It has two distinct forms, which are mirror images (or "enantiomorphs") of each other. The union of both forms is a compound of two snub dodecahedra, and the convex hull of both forms is a truncated icosidodecahedron.

== Construction ==
The snub dodecahedron can be constructed from a regular dodecahedron, separating all of its pentagonal faces and filling the gaps with equilateral triangles. The name originates from Kepler's Harmonices Mundi in 1619, written in the language of Latin as dodecahedron simum. H. S. M. Coxeter noted it could be derived equally from either the regular octahedron or the icosahedron.

Construction of a snub dodecahedron from a rhombicosidodecahedron

Transformation of a regular dodecahedron (left) and a regular icosahedron (right) into a snub dodecahedron

With the regular dodecahedron, the snub dodecahedron can be generated from taking the twelve pentagonal faces and pulling them outward so the faces can no longer touch. At a proper distance, this can create the rhombicosidodecahedron by filling in square faces between the divided edges and triangle faces between the divided vertices. But for the snub form, pull the pentagonal faces out slightly less, only add the triangle faces, and leave the other gaps empty (the other gaps are rectangles at this point). Then apply an equal rotation to the centers of the pentagons and triangles, continuing the rotation until the gaps can be filled by two equilateral triangles. (The fact that the proper amount to pull the faces out is less in the case of the snub dodecahedron can be seen in either of two ways: the circumradius of the snub dodecahedron is smaller than that of the icosidodecahedron; or, the edge length of the equilateral triangles formed by the divided vertices increases when the pentagonal faces are rotated.)

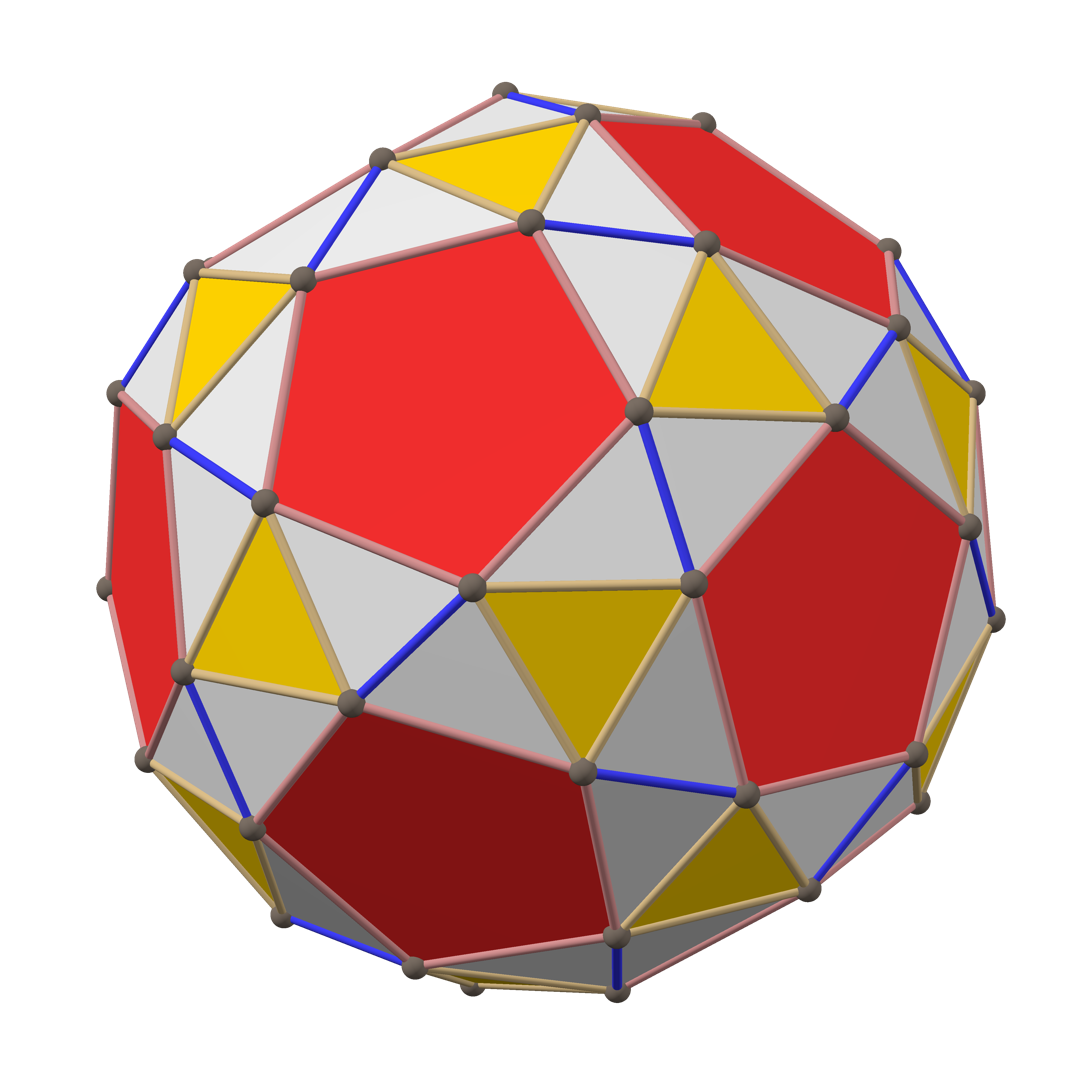
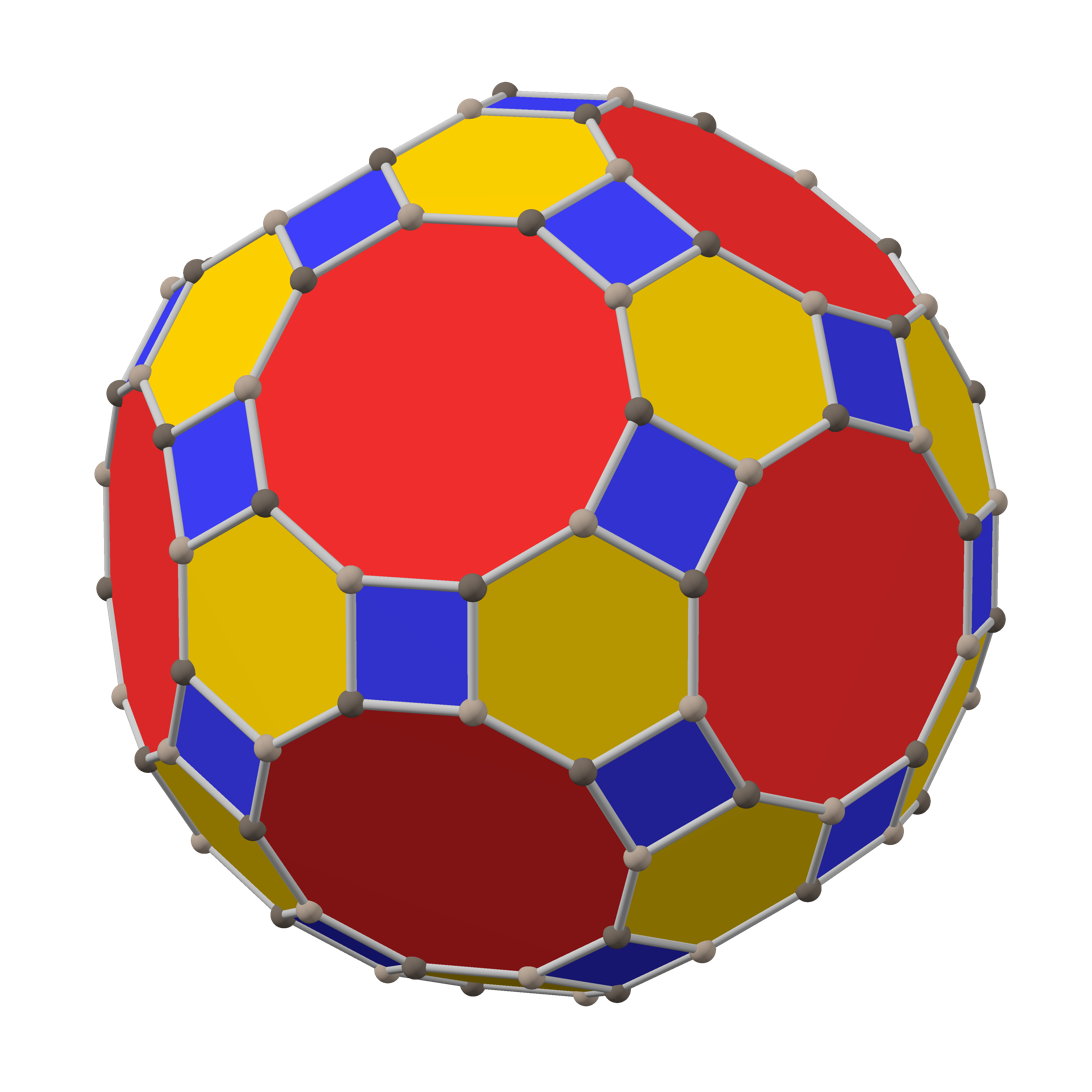
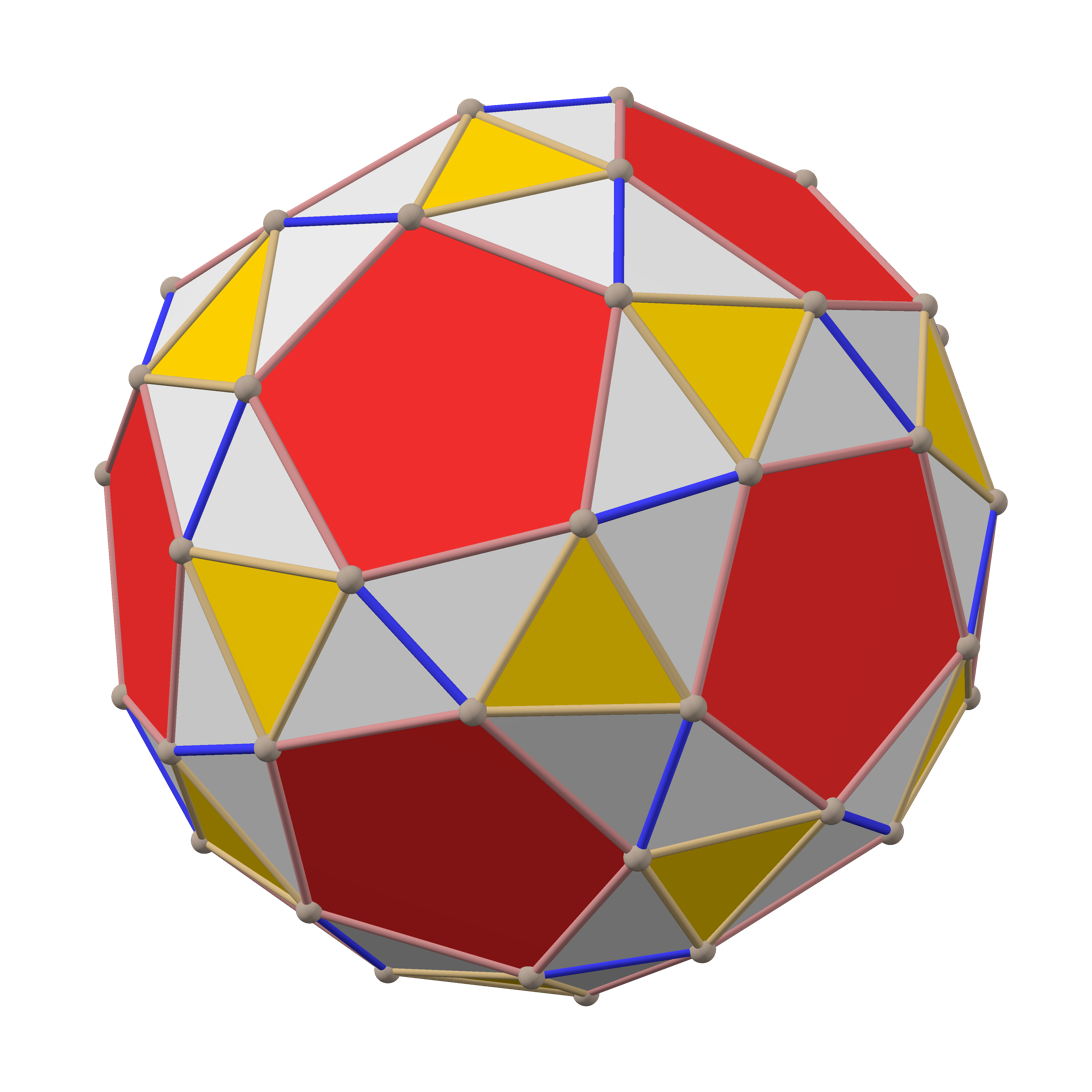
Uniform alternation of a truncated icosidodecahedron

The snub dodecahedron can also be derived from the truncated icosidodecahedron by the process of alternation. Sixty of the vertices of the truncated icosidodecahedron form a polyhedron topologically equivalent to one snub dodecahedron; the remaining sixty form its mirror-image. The resulting polyhedron is vertex-transitive but not uniform.

=== Cartesian coordinates ===
Let ξ ≈ 0.94315125924 be the real zero of the cubic polynomial x^{3} + 2x^{2} − φ^{2}, where φ is the golden ratio. Let the point p be given by
$$p=
\begin{pmatrix}
\varphi^2-\varphi^2\xi \\
-\varphi^3+\varphi\xi+2\varphi\xi^2 \\
\xi
\end{pmatrix}.$$
Let the rotation matrices M_{1} and M_{2} be given by
$$M_1=
\begin{pmatrix}
\frac{1}{2\varphi}  & -\frac{\varphi}{2} & \frac{1}{2} \\
\frac{\varphi}{2}   & \frac{1}{2}     & \frac{1}{2\varphi} \\
-\frac{1}{2}     & \frac{1}{2\varphi} & \frac{\varphi}{2}
\end{pmatrix}, \quad M_2=
\begin{pmatrix}
0  & 0 & 1 \\
1  & 0 & 0 \\
0  & 1 & 0
\end{pmatrix}.$$
M_{1} represents the rotation around the axis (0, 1, φ) through an angle of 2π/5 counterclockwise, while M_{2} being a cyclic shift of (x, y, z) represents the rotation around the axis (1, 1, 1) through an angle of 2π/3. Then the 60 vertices of the snub dodecahedron are the 60 images of point p under repeated multiplication by M_{1} and/or M_{2}, iterated to convergence. (The matrices M_{1} and M_{2} generate the 60 rotation matrices corresponding to the 60 rotational symmetries of a regular icosahedron.) The coordinates of the vertices are integral linear combinations of 1, φ, ξ, φξ, ξ^{2} and φξ^{2}. The edge length equals
$$2\xi\sqrt{1-\xi}\approx 0.449\,750\,618\,41.$$
Negating all coordinates gives the mirror image of this snub dodecahedron.

== Properties ==
=== Measurement ===
For a snub dodecahedron whose edge length is 1, the surface area is
$$A = 20\sqrt{3} + 3\sqrt{25+10\sqrt{5}} \approx 55.287.$$
Its volume is
$$V= \frac{(3\varphi+1)\xi^2+(3\varphi+1)\xi-\varphi/6-2}{\sqrt{3\xi^2-\varphi^2}} \approx 37.617.$$

There are two inscribed spheres, one touching the triangular faces and one, slightly smaller, touching the pentagonal faces. Their radii are, respectively:
$$\begin{align}
r_3 &= \frac{\varphi\sqrt3}{6\xi}\sqrt{\frac{1}{1-\xi}}\approx 2.077\,089\,659\,74 \\[4pt]
r_5 &= \frac12\sqrt{\varphi^2\xi^2 + 3\varphi^2\xi + \frac{11}{5}\varphi + \frac{12}{5}}\approx 1.980\,915\,947\,28.
\end{align}$$
Alternatively, r_{3} and r_{5} can be expressed as roots of the following respective polynomials:

$$2985984 x^{12} - 14183424 x^{10} + 5723136 x^8 - 478656 x^6 + 12528 x^4 - 360 x^2 + 1$$

$$512000 x^{12} - 1920000 x^{10} - 460800 x^8 + 424000 x^6 + 53040 x^4 - 20600 x^2 + 961$$

In addition, r_{5} is also the outward offset required upon snubification of a dodecahedron (edge length = 1) to construct a pentagonal hexecontahedron, the dual of the snub dodecahedron.

The four positive real roots of the sextic equation in R^{2}
$$4096R^{12} - 27648R^{10} + 47104R^8 - 35776R^6 + 13872R^4 - 2696R^2 + 209 = 0$$
are the circumradii of the snub dodecahedron (U_{29}), great snub icosidodecahedron (U_{57}), great inverted snub icosidodecahedron (U_{69}), and great retrosnub icosidodecahedron (U_{74}).

=== Sphericity ===
The snub dodecahedron has the highest sphericity of all Archimedean solids. If sphericity is defined as the ratio of volume squared over surface area cubed, multiplied by a constant of 36π (where this constant makes the sphericity of a sphere equal to 1), the sphericity of the snub dodecahedron is about 0.947.

== Geometric relations ==
Alternatively, combining the vertices of the snub dodecahedron given by the Cartesian coordinates (above) and its mirror will form a semiregular truncated icosidodecahedron. The comparisons between these regular and semiregular polyhedrons is shown in the figure to the right.

Cartesian coordinates for the vertices of this alternative snub dodecahedron are obtained by selecting sets of 12 (of 24 possible even permutations contained in the five sets of truncated icosidodecahedron Cartesian coordinates). The alternations are those with an odd number of minus signs in these three sets:

Overlay of regular and semiregular truncated icosidodecahedra and snub dodecahedra

$$\begin{array}{ccccccc}
\Bigl(& \pm \tfrac{1}{\varphi} &,& \pm \tfrac{1}{\varphi} &,& \pm [3 + \varphi] & \Bigr), \\[2pt]
\Bigl(& \pm \tfrac{1}{\varphi} &,& \pm\,\varphi^2 &,& \pm [3\varphi - 1] & \Bigr),  \\[2pt]
\Bigl(& \pm [2\varphi - 1] &,& \pm\,2 &,& \pm [2 + \varphi] & \Bigr),
\end{array}$$
and an even number of minus signs in these two sets:
$$\begin{array}{ccccccc}
\Bigl(& \pm \tfrac{2}{\varphi} &,& \pm\,\varphi &,& \pm [1 + 2\varphi] & \Bigr), \\[2pt]
\Bigl(& \pm\,\varphi &,& \pm\,3 &,& \pm\,2\varphi & \Bigr),
\end{array}$$

where $\varphi = \tfrac{1 + \sqrt 5}{2}$ is the golden ratio. The mirrors of both the regular truncated icosidodecahedron and this alternative snub dodecahedron are obtained by switching the even and odd references to both sign and position permutations.

== Related polyhedra and tilings ==
Family of uniform icosahedral polyhedra
Symmetry: [5,3], (*532)							[5,3]^{+}, (532)
{5,3}	t{5,3}	r{5,3}	t{3,5}	{3,5}	rr{5,3}	tr{5,3}	sr{5,3}
Duals to uniform polyhedra
V5.5.5	V3.10.10	V3.5.3.5	V5.6.6	V3.3.3.3.3	V3.4.5.4	V4.6.10	V3.3.3.3.5

This semiregular polyhedron is a member of a sequence of snubbed polyhedra and tilings with vertex figure (3.3.3.3.n) and Coxeter–Dynkin diagram. These figures and their duals have (n32) rotational symmetry, being in the Euclidean plane for n = 6, and hyperbolic plane for any higher n. The series can be considered to begin with n = 2, with one set of faces degenerated into digons.

n32 symmetry mutations of snub tilings: 3.3.3.3.n
Symmetry n32	Spherical				Euclidean	Compact hyperbolic		Paracomp.
Symmetry n32	232	332	432	532	632	732	832	∞32
Snub figures								
Config.	3.3.3.3.2	3.3.3.3.3	3.3.3.3.4	3.3.3.3.5	3.3.3.3.6	3.3.3.3.7	3.3.3.3.8	3.3.3.3.∞
Gyro figures								
Config.	V3.3.3.3.2	V3.3.3.3.3	V3.3.3.3.4	V3.3.3.3.5	V3.3.3.3.6	V3.3.3.3.7	V3.3.3.3.8	V3.3.3.3.∞

== Snub dodecahedral graph ==
Snub dodecahedral graph
- 5-fold symmetry Schlegel diagram
- Vertices: 60
- Edges: 150
- Automorphisms: 60
- Properties: Hamiltonian, regular

In the mathematical field of graph theory, a snub dodecahedral graph is the graph of vertices and edges of the snub dodecahedron, one of the Archimedean solids. It has 60 vertices and 150 edges, and is an Archimedean graph.

== See also ==
- Planar polygon to polyhedron transformation animation
- Spinning dextro and laevo snub dodecahedron
