= Isohedral figure =

Generalisation of dice with identical faces

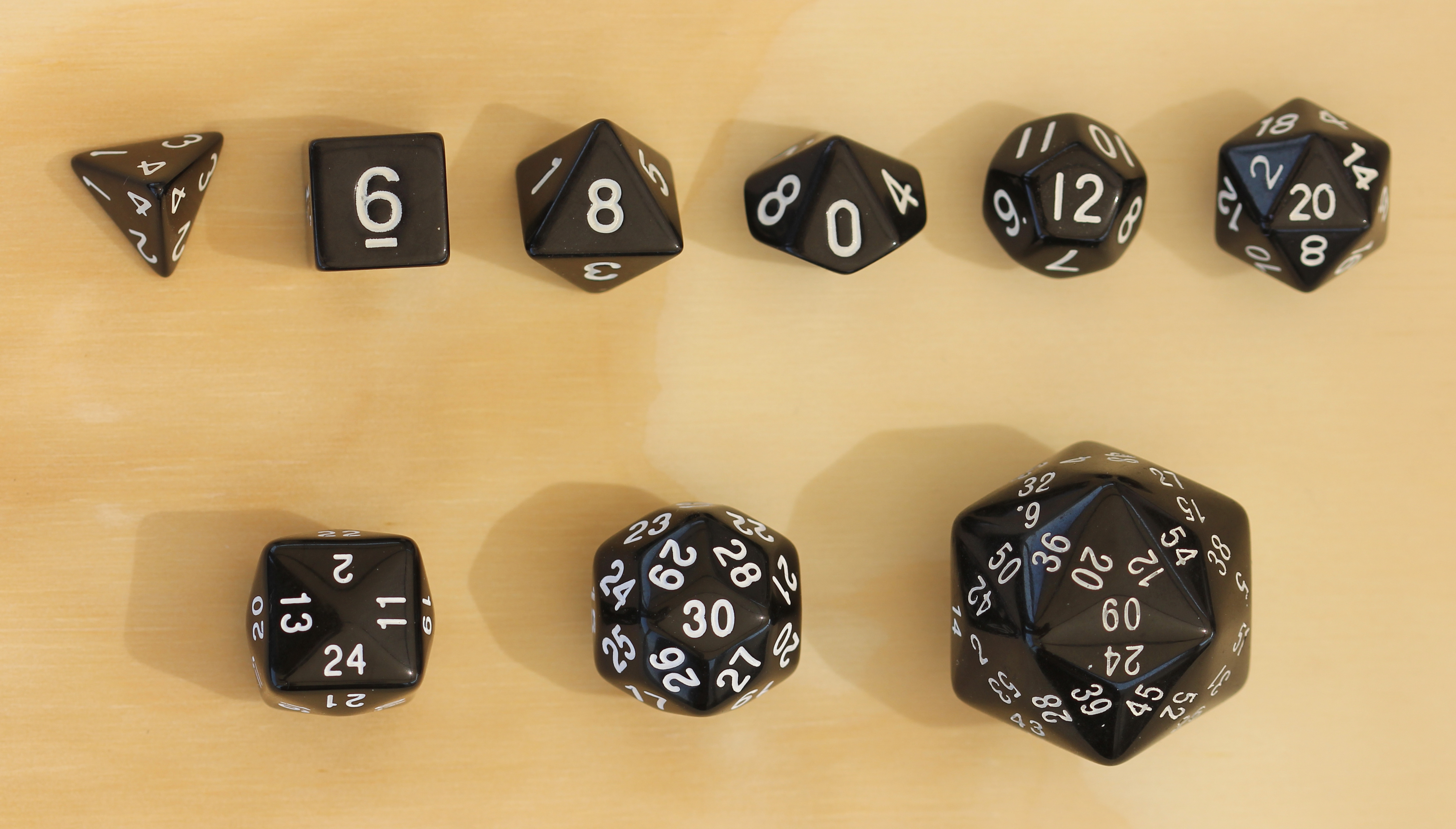
A set of isohedral dice

In geometry, a tessellation of dimension 2 (a plane tiling) or higher, or a polytope of dimension 3 (a polyhedron) or higher, is isohedral or face-transitive if all its faces are the same. More specifically, all faces must be not merely congruent but must be transitive, i.e. must lie within the same symmetry orbit. In other words, for any two faces A and B, there must be a symmetry of the entire figure by translations, rotations, and/or reflections that maps A onto B. For this reason, convex isohedral polyhedra are the shapes that will make fair dice.

Isohedral polyhedra are called isohedra. They can be described by their face configuration. An isohedron has an even number of faces.

The dual of an isohedral polyhedron is vertex-transitive, i.e. isogonal. The Catalan solids, the Platonic Solids, the bipyramids, and the trapezohedra are all isohedral. They are the duals of the (isogonal) Archimedean solids, Platonic Solids, prisms, and antiprisms, respectively. The Platonic solids, which are either self-dual or dual with another Platonic solid, are vertex-, edge-, and face-transitive (i.e. isogonal, isotoxal, and isohedral).

A form that is isohedral, has regular vertices, and is also edge-transitive (i.e. isotoxal) is said to be a quasiregular dual. Some theorists regard these figures as truly quasiregular because they share the same symmetries, but this is not generally accepted.

A polyhedron which is isohedral and isogonal is said to be noble.

Not all isozonohedra are isohedral. For example, a rhombic icosahedron is an isozonohedron but not an isohedron.

== Examples ==
Convex			Concave
Hexagonal bipyramids, V4.4.6, are nonregular isohedral polyhedra.	The Cairo pentagonal tiling, V3.3.4.3.4, is isohedral.	The rhombic dodecahedral honeycomb is isohedral (and isochoric, and space-filling).	A square tiling distorted into a spiraling H tiling (topologically equivalent) is still isohedral.

== Classes of isohedra by symmetry ==
Faces	Face config.	Class	Name	Symmetry	Order	Convex	Coplanar	Nonconvex
4	V3^{3}	Platonic	tetrahedron tetragonal disphenoid rhombic disphenoid	T_{d}, [3,3], (*332); D_{2d}, [2^{+},2], (2*); D_{2}, [2,2]^{+}, (222)	24; 4; 4; 4	Tetrahedron		
6	V3^{4}	Platonic	cube trigonal trapezohedron asymmetric trigonal trapezohedron	O_{h}, [4,3], (*432); D_{3d}, [2^{+},6] (2*3); D_{3} [2,3]^{+}, (223)	48; 12; 12; 6	Cube		
8	V4^{3}	Platonic	octahedron square bipyramid rhombic bipyramid square scalenohedron	O_{h}, [4,3], (*432); D_{4h},[2,4],(*224); D_{2h},[2,2],(*222); D_{2d},[2^{+},4],(2*2)	48; 16; 8; 8	Octahedron		
12	V3^{5}	Platonic	regular dodecahedron pyritohedron tetartoid	I_{h}, [5,3], (*532); T_{h}, [3^{+},4], (3*2); T, [3,3]^{+}, (*332)	120; 24; 12	Dodecahedron		
20	V5^{3}	Platonic	regular icosahedron	I_{h}, [5,3], (*532)	120	Icosahedron		
12	V3.6^{2}	Catalan	triakis tetrahedron	T_{d}, [3,3], (*332)	24	Triakis tetrahedron		
12	V(3.4)^{2}	Catalan	rhombic dodecahedron deltoidal dodecahedron	O_{h}, [4,3], (*432); T_{d}, [3,3], (*332)	48; 24	Rhombic dodecahedron		
24	V3.8^{2}	Catalan	triakis octahedron	O_{h}, [4,3], (*432)	48	Triakis octahedron		
24	V4.6^{2}	Catalan	tetrakis hexahedron	O_{h}, [4,3], (*432)	48	Tetrakis hexahedron		
24	V3.4^{3}	Catalan	deltoidal icositetrahedron	O_{h}, [4,3], (*432)	48	Deltoidal icositetrahedron		
48	V4.6.8	Catalan	disdyakis dodecahedron	O_{h}, [4,3], (*432)	48	Disdyakis dodecahedron		
24	V3^{4}.4	Catalan	pentagonal icositetrahedron	O, [4,3]^{+}, (432)	24	Pentagonal icositetrahedron		
30	V(3.5)^{2}	Catalan	rhombic triacontahedron	I_{h}, [5,3], (*532)	120	Rhombic triacontahedron		
60	V3.10^{2}	Catalan	triakis icosahedron	I_{h}, [5,3], (*532)	120	Triakis icosahedron		
60	V5.6^{2}	Catalan	pentakis dodecahedron	I_{h}, [5,3], (*532)	120	Pentakis dodecahedron		
60	V3.4.5.4	Catalan	deltoidal hexecontahedron	I_{h}, [5,3], (*532)	120	Deltoidal hexecontahedron		
120	V4.6.10	Catalan	disdyakis triacontahedron	I_{h}, [5,3], (*532)	120	Disdyakis triacontahedron		
60	V3^{4}.5	Catalan	pentagonal hexecontahedron	I, [5,3]^{+}, (532)	60	Pentagonal hexecontahedron		
2n	V3^{3}.n	Polar	trapezohedron asymmetric trapezohedron	D_{nd}, [2^{+},2n], (2*n); D_{n}, [2,n]^{+}, (22n)	4n 2n			
2n 4n	V4^{2}.n; V4^{2}.2n; V4^{2}.2n	Polar	regular n-bipyramid isotoxal 2n-bipyramid 2n-scalenohedron	D_{nh}, [2,n], (*22n); D_{nh}, [2,n], (*22n); D_{nd}, [2^{+},2n], (2*n)	4n			

== k-isohedral figure ==
A polyhedron (or polytope in general) is k-isohedral if it contains k faces within its symmetry fundamental domains. Similarly, a k-isohedral tiling has k separate symmetry orbits (it may contain m different face shapes, for m = k, or only for some m < k). ("1-isohedral" is the same as "isohedral".)

A monohedral polyhedron or monohedral tiling (m = 1) has congruent faces, either directly or reflectively, which occur in one or more symmetry positions. An m-hedral polyhedron or tiling has m different face shapes ("dihedral", "trihedral"... are the same as "2-hedral", "3-hedral"... respectively).

Here are some examples of k-isohedral polyhedra and tilings, with their faces colored by their k symmetry positions:

3-isohedral	4-isohedral	isohedral	2-isohedral
2-hedral regular-faced polyhedra		Monohedral polyhedra	
The rhombicuboctahedron has 1 triangle type and 2 square types.	The pseudo-rhombicuboctahedron has 1 triangle type and 3 square types.	The deltoidal icositetrahedron has 1 face type.	The pseudo-deltoidal icositetrahedron has 2 face types, with same shape.

2-isohedral	4-isohedral	Isohedral	3-isohedral
2-hedral regular-faced tilings		Monohedral tilings	
The Pythagorean tiling has 2 square types (sizes).	This 3-uniform tiling has 3 triangle types, with same shape, and 1 square type.	The herringbone pattern has 1 rectangle type.	This pentagonal tiling has 3 irregular pentagon types, with same shape.

== Related terms ==
A cell-transitive or isochoric figure is an n-polytope (n ≥ 4) or n-honeycomb (n ≥ 3) that has its cells congruent and transitive with each others. In 3 dimensions, the catoptric honeycombs, duals to the uniform honeycombs, are isochoric. In 4 dimensions, isochoric polytopes have been enumerated up to 20 cells.

A facet-transitive or isotopic figure is an n-dimensional polytope or honeycomb with its facets ((n−1)-faces) congruent and transitive. The dual of an isotope is an isogonal polytope. By definition, this isotopic property is common to the duals of the uniform polytopes.

- An isotopic 2-dimensional figure is isotoxal, i.e. edge-transitive.
- An isotopic 3-dimensional figure is isohedral, i.e. face-transitive.
- An isotopic 4-dimensional figure is isochoric, i.e. cell-transitive.

== See also ==
- Edge-transitive
- Anisohedral tiling
