= Archimedean solid =

Polyhedra in which all vertices are the same

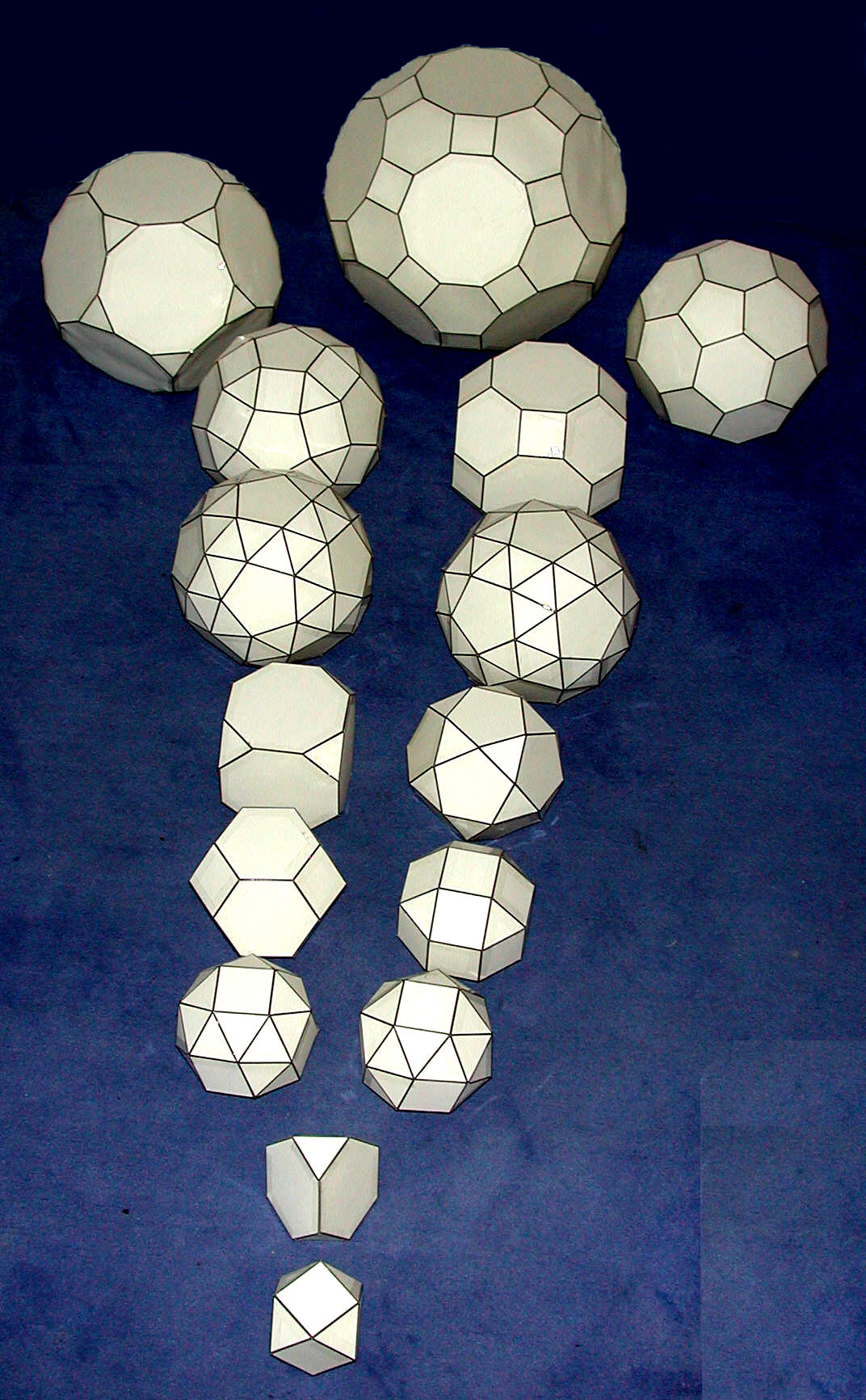
The Archimedean solids. Two of them are chiral, with both forms shown, making 15 models in all.

The Archimedean solids are a set of thirteen convex polyhedra whose faces are regular polygons and are vertex-transitive, although they are not face-transitive and are generally not edge-transitive. The solids were named after Archimedes, although he did not claim credit for them. They belong to the class of uniform polyhedra, the polyhedra with regular faces and symmetric vertices. Some Archimedean solids were portrayed in the works of artists and mathematicians during the Renaissance.

The elongated square gyrobicupola or pseudorhombicuboctahedron is an extra polyhedron with regular faces and congruent vertices. Still, it is not generally counted as an Archimedean solid because it is not vertex-transitive.

== Polyhedra ==
The Archimedean solids have a single vertex configuration and highly symmetric properties. A vertex configuration indicates which regular polygons meet at each vertex. For instance, the configuration $3 \cdot 5 \cdot 3 \cdot 5$ indicates a polyhedron in which each vertex is met by alternating two triangles and two pentagons. Highly symmetric properties in this case mean the symmetry group of each solid was derived from the Platonic solids, resulting from their construction. Some sources say the Archimedean solids are synonymous with the semiregular polyhedra. Yet, the definition of a semiregular polyhedron may also include the infinite families of prisms and antiprisms, as well as the elongated square gyrobicupola.

The skeleton of Archimedean solids can be drawn in a graph, named Archimedean graph. Such graphs are regular, polyhedral (and therefore by necessity also 3-vertex-connected planar graphs), and also Hamiltonian graphs.

The thirteen Archimedean solids
Name	Solids	Vertex configurations	Faces	Edges	Vertices	Point group
Truncated tetrahedron	Truncated tetrahedron	3.6.6	4 triangles 4 hexagons	18	12	T_{d}
Cuboctahedron	Cuboctahedron	3.4.3.4	8 triangles 6 squares	24	12	O_{h}
Truncated cube	Truncated hexahedron	3.8.8	8 triangles 6 octagons	36	24	O_{h}
Truncated octahedron	Truncated octahedron	4.6.6	6 squares 8 hexagons	36	24	O_{h}
Rhombicuboctahedron	Rhombicuboctahedron	3.4.4.4	8 triangles 18 squares	48	24	O_{h}
Truncated cuboctahedron	Truncated cuboctahedron	4.6.8	12 squares 8 hexagons 6 octagons	72	48	O_{h}
Snub cube	Snub hexahedron (Ccw)	3.3.3.3.4	32 triangles 6 squares	60	24	O
Icosidodecahedron	Icosidodecahedron	3.5.3.5	20 triangles 12 pentagons	60	30	I_{h}
Truncated dodecahedron	Truncated dodecahedron	3.10.10	20 triangles 12 decagons	90	60	I_{h}
Truncated icosahedron	Truncated icosahedron	5.6.6	12 pentagons 20 hexagons	90	60	I_{h}
Rhombicosidodecahedron	Rhombicosidodecahedron	3.4.5.4	20 triangles 30 squares 12 pentagons	120	60	I_{h}
Truncated icosidodecahedron	Truncated icosidodecahedron	4.6.10	30 squares 20 hexagons 12 decagons	180	120	I_{h}
Snub dodecahedron	Snub dodecahedron (Cw)	3.3.3.3.5	80 triangles 12 pentagons	150	60	I

The construction of some Archimedean solids begins from the Platonic solids. The truncation involves cutting away corners; to preserve symmetry, the cut is in a plane perpendicular to the line joining a corner to the center of the polyhedron and is the same for all corners, and an example can be found in truncated icosahedron constructed by cutting off all the icosahedron's vertices, having the same symmetry as the icosahedron, the icosahedral symmetry. If the truncation is exactly deep enough such that each pair of faces from adjacent vertices shares exactly one point, it is known as a rectification. Expansion involves moving each face away from the center (by the same distance to preserve the symmetry of the Platonic solid) and taking the convex hull. An example is the rhombicuboctahedron, which is constructed by separating the cube or octahedron's faces from their centroids and filling them with squares. Snub is a construction process of polyhedra by separating the polyhedron faces, twisting their faces in certain angles, and filling them up with equilateral triangles. Examples can be found in snub cube and snub dodecahedron. The resulting construction of these solids gives the property of chirality, meaning they are not identical when reflected in a mirror. However, not all of them can be constructed in such a way, or they could be constructed alternatively. For example, the icosidodecahedron can be constructed by attaching two pentagonal rotunda bases-to-base, or a rhombicuboctahedron that can be constructed alternatively by attaching two square cupolas on the bases of an octagonal prism.

At least ten of the Archimedean solids have the Rupert property: each can pass through a copy of itself, of the same size. They are the cuboctahedron, truncated octahedron, truncated cube, rhombicuboctahedron, icosidodecahedron, truncated cuboctahedron, truncated icosahedron, truncated dodecahedron, and the truncated tetrahedron.

The dual polyhedron of an Archimedean solid is a Catalan solid.

== Background of discovery ==
The names of Archimedean solids were taken from the Ancient Greek mathematician Archimedes, who discussed them in a now-lost work. Although they were not credited to Archimedes originally, Pappus of Alexandria in the fifth section of his titled compendium Synagoge, referring to Archimedes, listed thirteen polyhedra and briefly described them in terms of how many faces of each kind these polyhedra have.

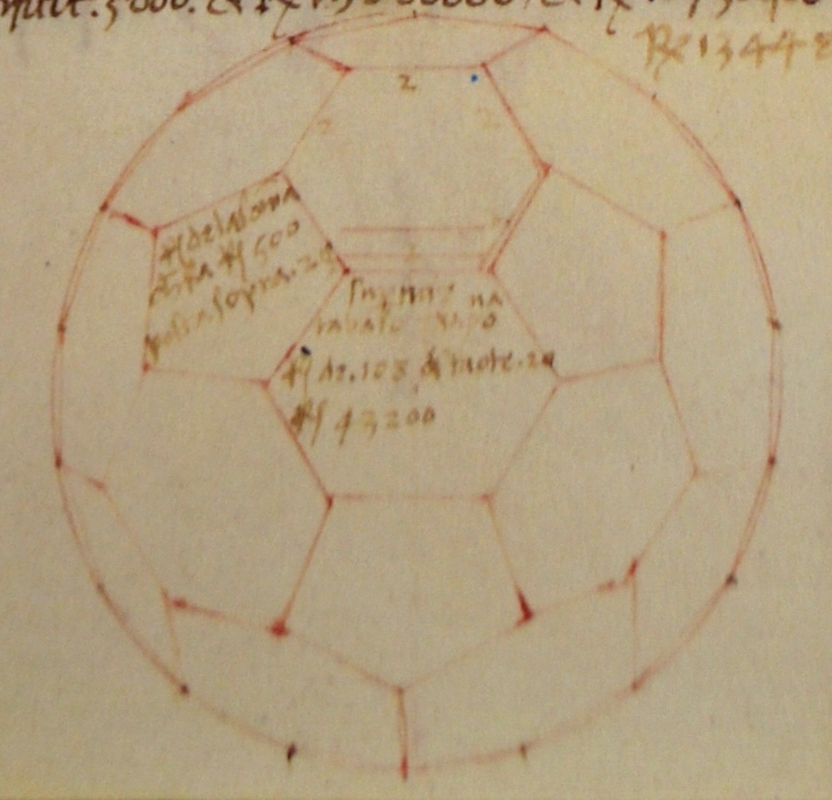
Truncated icosahedron in De quinque corporibus regularibus

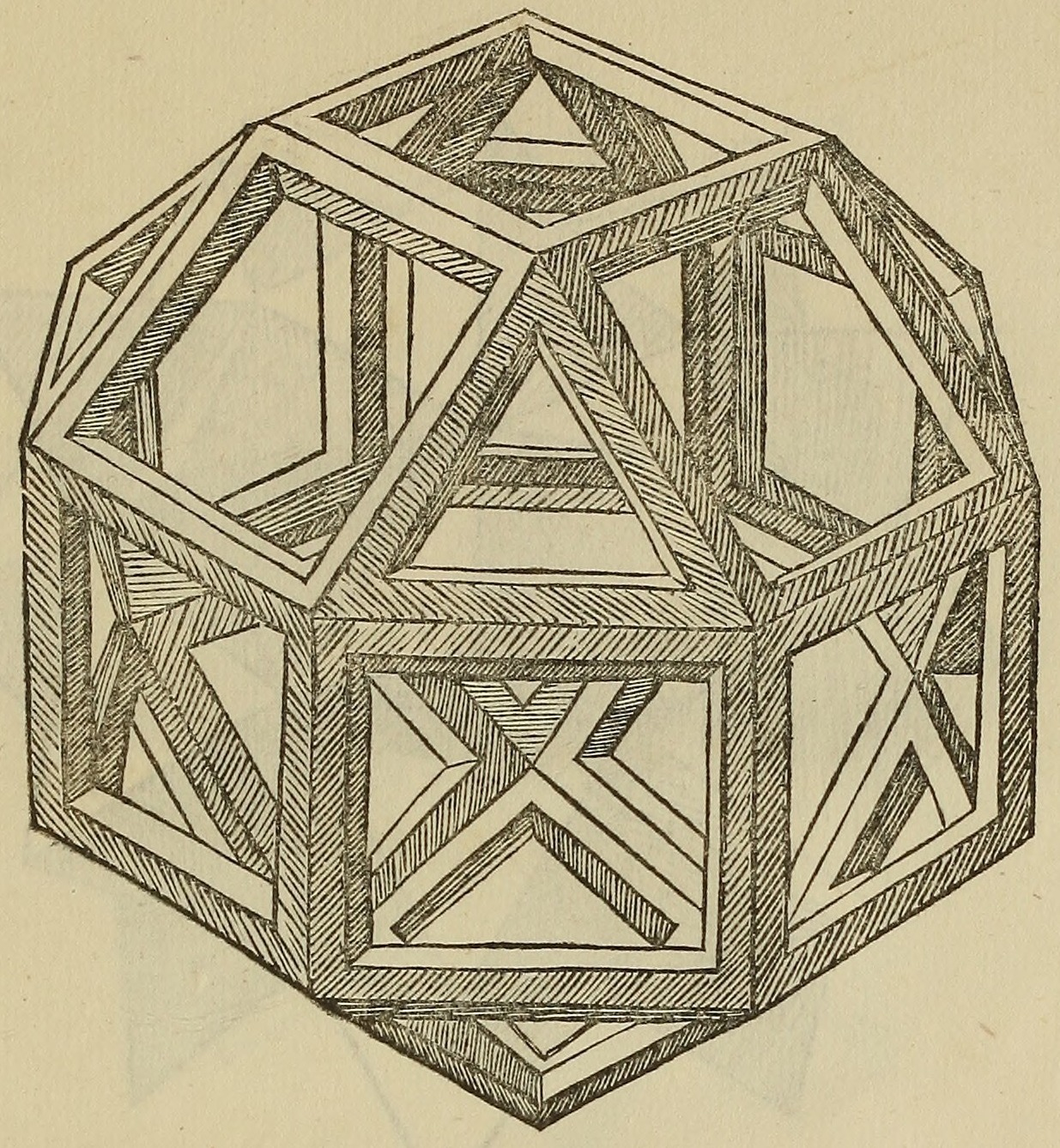
Rhombicuboctahedron drawn by Leonardo da Vinci

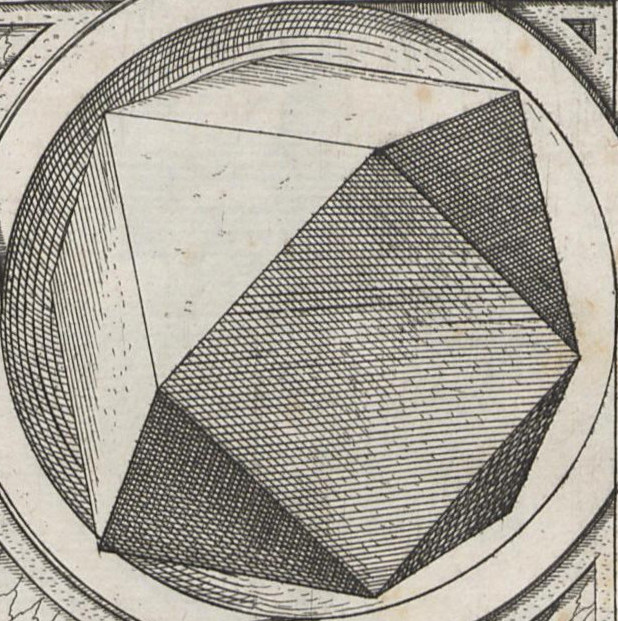
Cuboctahedron in Perspectiva Corporum Regularium

During the Renaissance, artists and mathematicians valued pure forms with high symmetry. Some Archimedean solids appeared in Piero della Francesca's De quinque corporibus regularibus, in attempting to study and copy the works of Archimedes, as well as include citations to Archimedes. Yet, he did not credit those shapes to Archimedes and knew of Archimedes' work, but rather appeared to be an independent rediscovery. Other appearance of the solids appeared in the works of Wenzel Jamnitzer's Perspectiva Corporum Regularium, and both Summa de arithmetica and Divina proportione by Luca Pacioli, drawn by Leonardo da Vinci. The net of Archimedean solids appeared in Albrecht Dürer's Underweysung der Messung, copied from the Pacioli's work. By around 1620, Johannes Kepler in his Harmonices Mundi had completed the rediscovery of the thirteen polyhedra, as well as defining the prisms, antiprisms, and the non-convex solids known as Kepler–Poinsot polyhedra.

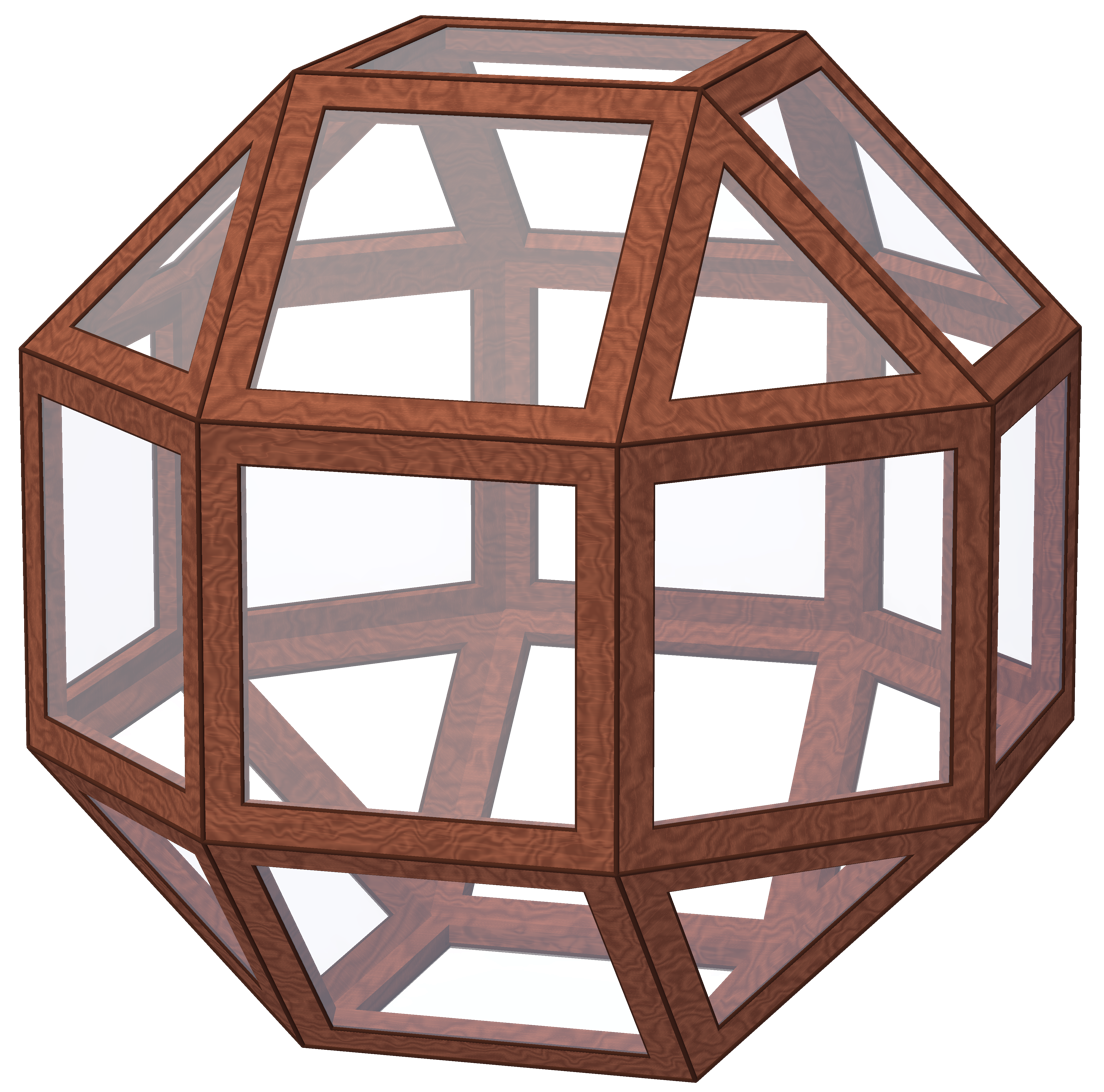
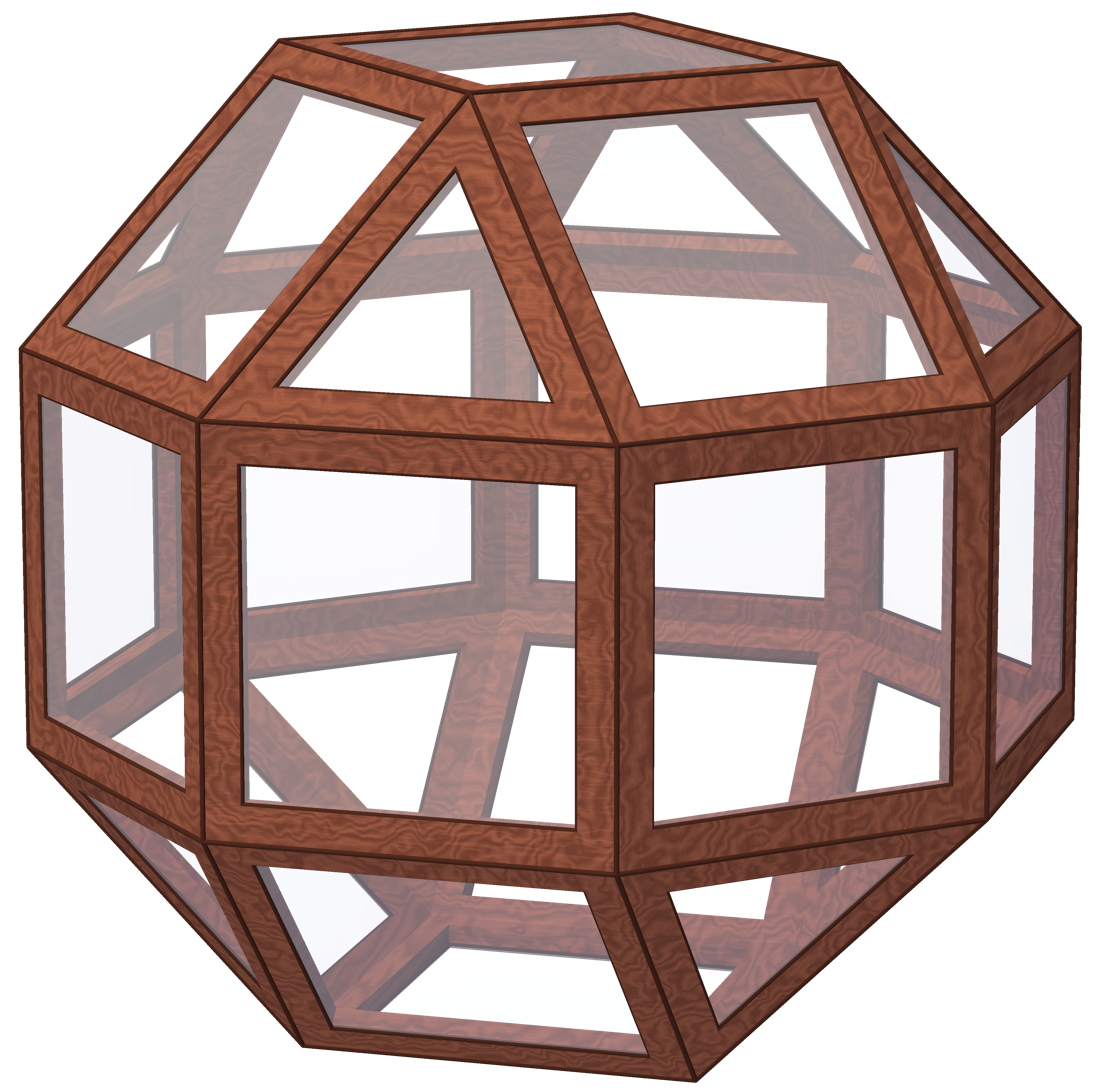
Rhombicuboctahedron and elongated square gyrobicupola. The latter is not vertex-transitive, and thus not Archimedean.

Kepler may have also found another solid known as elongated square gyrobicupola or pseudorhombicuboctahedron. Kepler once stated that there were fourteen Archimedean solids, yet his published enumeration only includes the thirteen uniform polyhedra. The first clear statement of such solid existence was made by Duncan Sommerville in 1905. The solid appeared when some mathematicians mistakenly constructed the rhombicuboctahedron: two square cupolas attached to the octagonal prism, with one of them rotated forty-five degrees. The thirteen solids have the property of vertex-transitive, meaning any two vertices of those can be translated onto the other one, but the elongated square gyrobicupola does not. Grünbaum (2009) observed that it meets a weaker definition of an Archimedean solid, in which "identical vertices" means merely that the parts of the polyhedron near any two vertices look the same (they have the same shapes of faces meeting around each vertex in the same order and forming the same angles). Grünbaum pointed out a frequent error in which authors define Archimedean solids using some form of this local definition but omit the fourteenth polyhedron. If only thirteen polyhedra are to be listed, the definition must use global symmetries of the polyhedron rather than local neighborhoods. In the aftermath, the elongated square gyrobicupola was withdrawn from the Archimedean solids and included in the Johnson solids instead, a convex polyhedron in which all of the faces are regular polygons.

== See also ==
- Conway polyhedron notation
- Johnson solid
