= Snub cube =

Archimedean solid with 38 faces

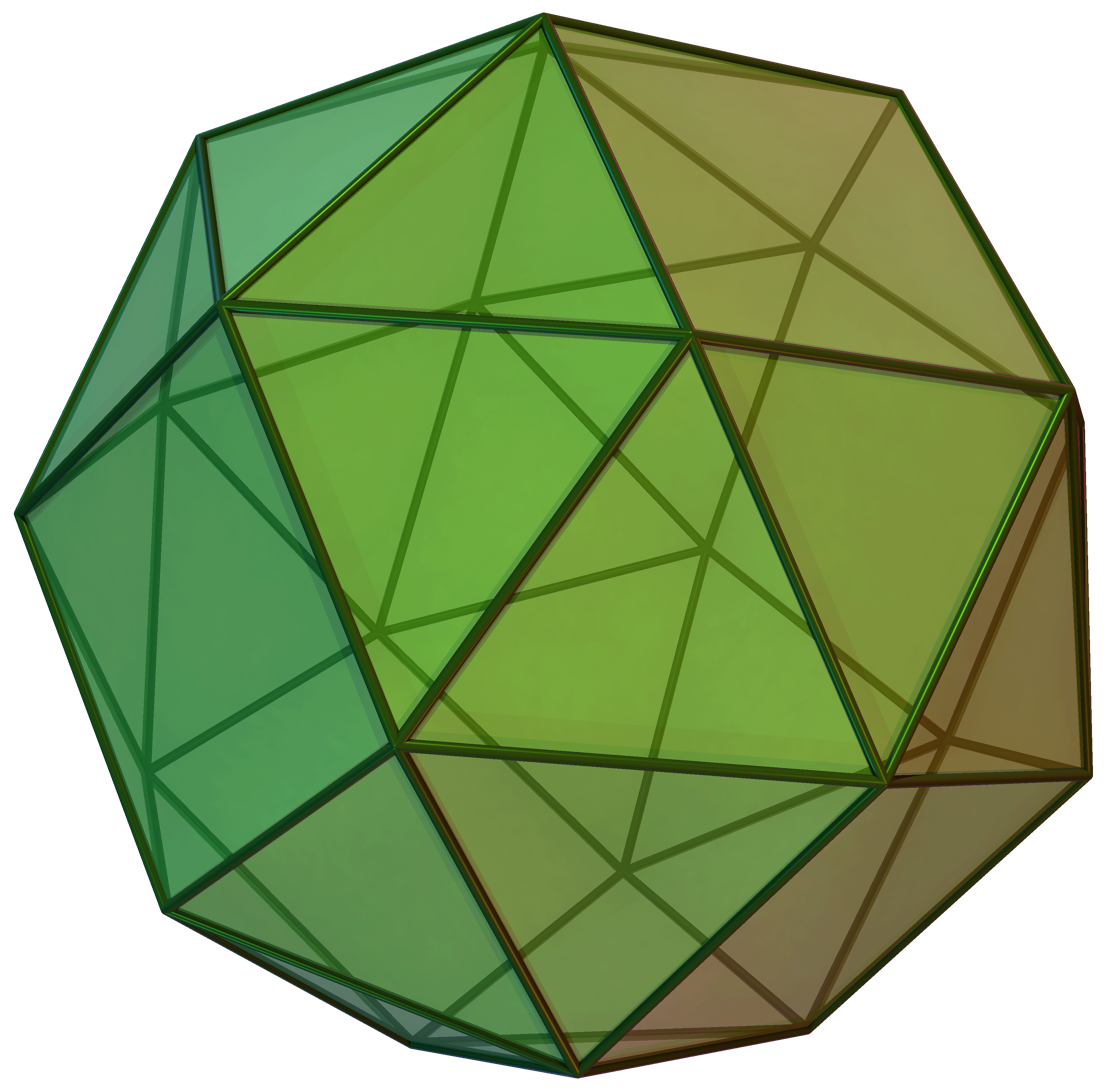
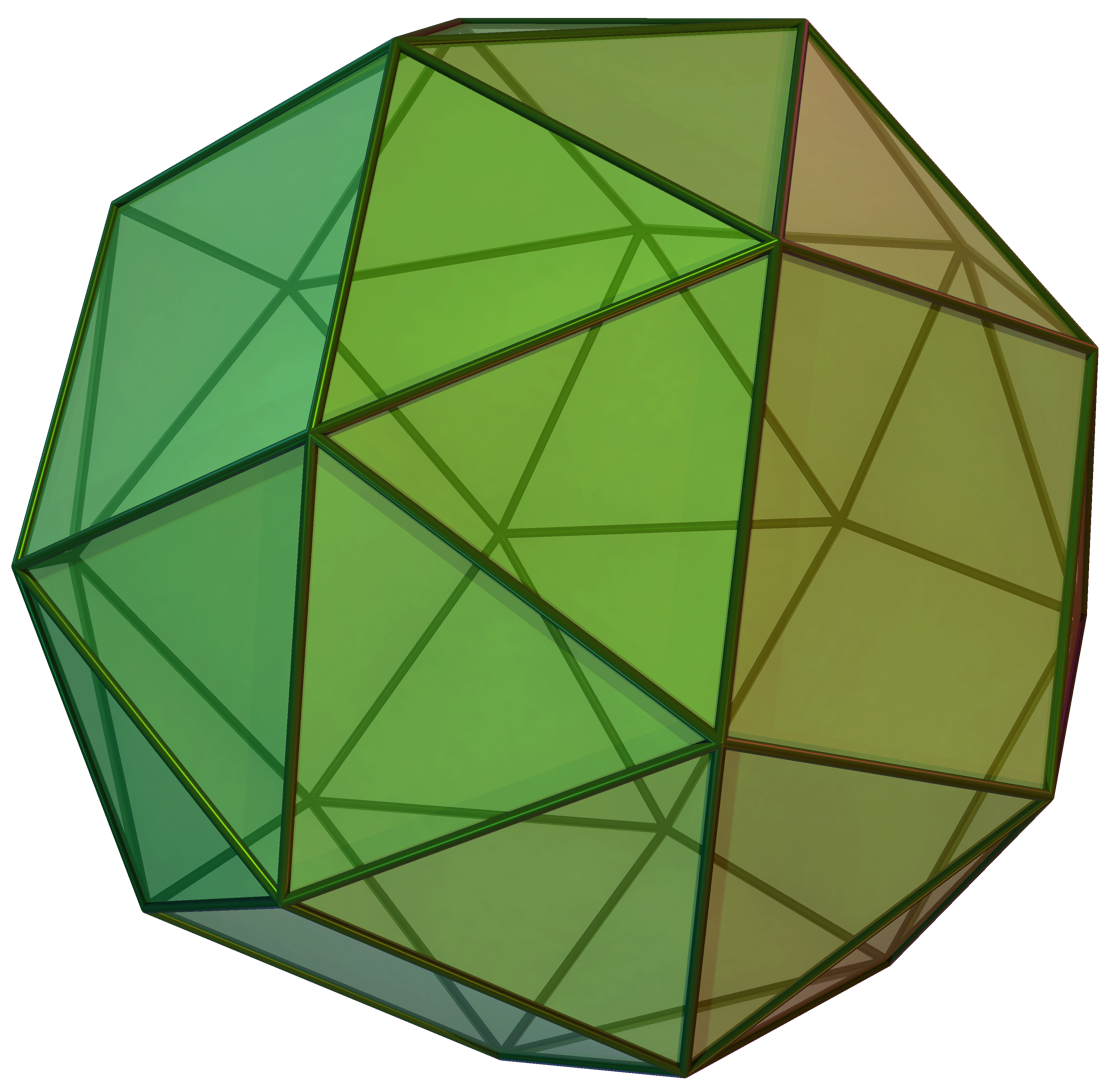
- Snub cube, left-chiral and right-chiral
- Type: Archimedean solid
- Faces: 38
- Edges: 60
- Vertices: 24
- Symmetry group: Rotational octahedral symmetry $\mathrm{O}$
- Dihedral angle (degrees): triangle-to-triangle: 153.23° triangle-to-square: 142.98°
- Dual polyhedron: Pentagonal icositetrahedron
- Properties: convex, chiral

Vertex figure

Net

In geometry, the snub cube, or snub cuboctahedron, is an Archimedean solid with 38 faces: 6 squares and 32 equilateral triangles. It has 60 edges and 24 vertices. Kepler first named it in Latin as cubus simus in 1619 in his Harmonices Mundi. H. S. M. Coxeter, noting it could be derived equally from the octahedron as the cube, called it snub cuboctahedron, with a vertical extended Schläfli symbol $s \scriptstyle\begin{Bmatrix} 4 \\ 3 \end{Bmatrix}$, and representing an alternation of a truncated cuboctahedron, which has Schläfli symbol $t \scriptstyle\begin{Bmatrix} 4 \\ 3 \end{Bmatrix}$.

The snub cube, like the snub dodecahedron, is chiral, which means it does not equal its mirror image; it has two equally valid forms.

== Construction ==
The snub cube can be generated by taking the six faces of the cube, pulling them outward so they no longer touch, then giving them each a small rotation on their centers (all clockwise or all counter-clockwise) until the spaces between can be filled with equilateral triangles.

Construction of a snub cube from a rhombicuboctahedron

The snub cube may also be constructed from a rhombicuboctahedron. It started by twisting its square face (in blue), allowing its triangles (in red) to be automatically twisted in opposite directions, forming other square faces (in white) to be skewed quadrilaterals that can be filled in two equilateral triangles.

Transformation of a cube (left) and a regular octahedron (right) into a snub cube

The snub cube can also be derived from the truncated cuboctahedron by the process of alternation. 24 vertices of the truncated cuboctahedron form a polyhedron topologically equivalent to the snub cube; the other 24 form its mirror-image. The resulting polyhedron is vertex-transitive but not uniform.

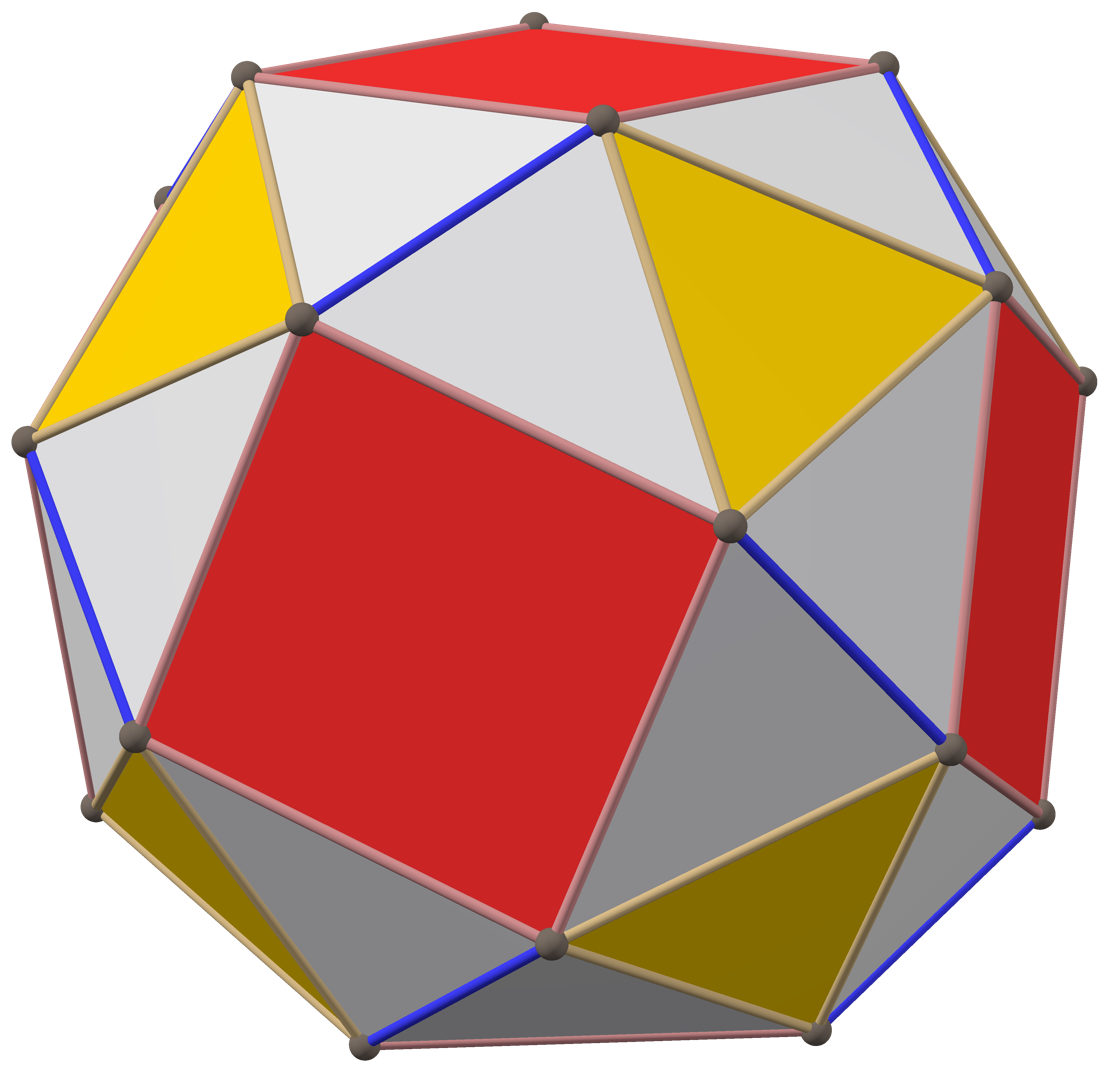
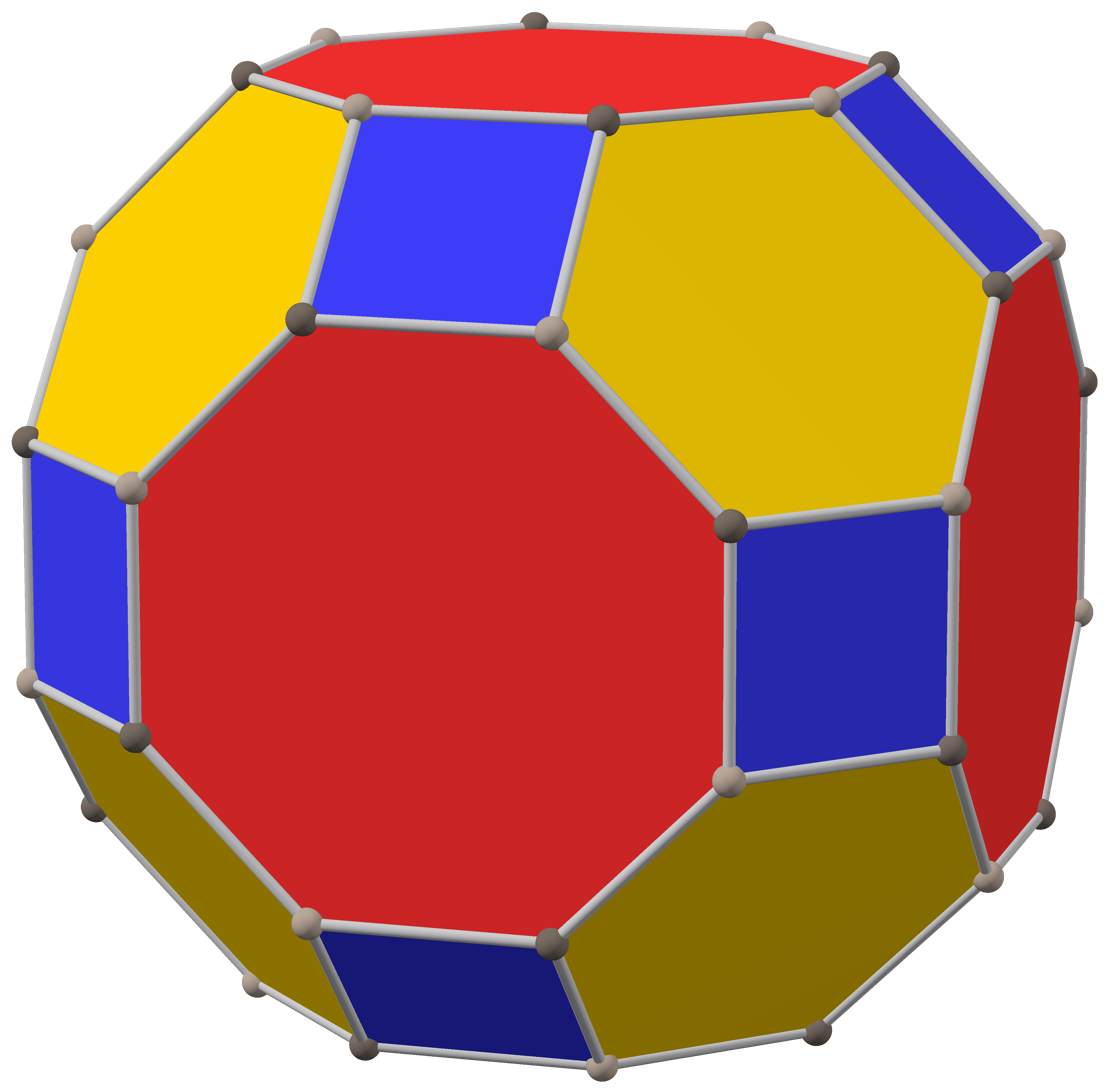
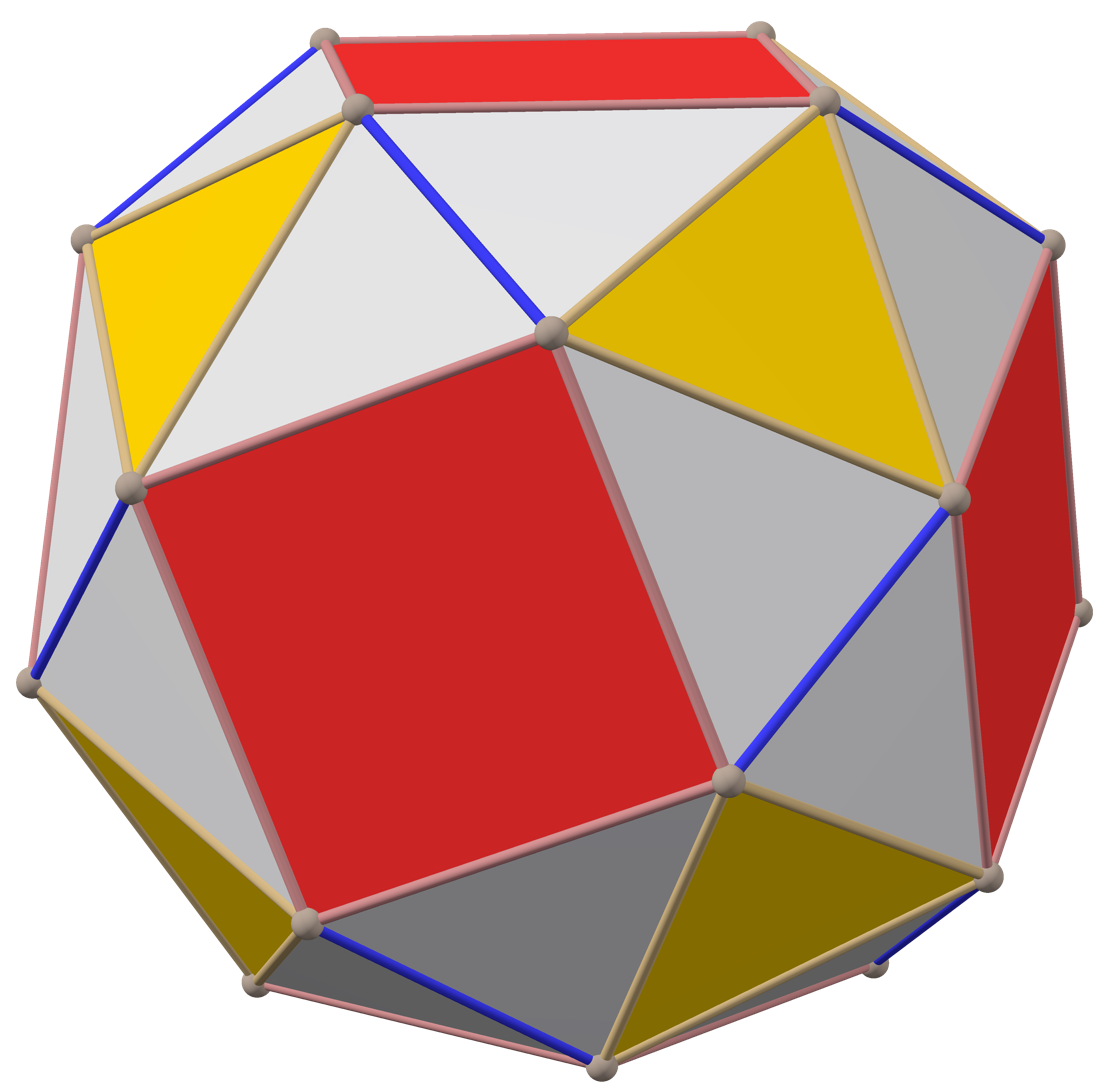
Uniform alternation of a truncated cuboctahedron

=== Cartesian coordinates ===
Cartesian coordinates for the vertices of a snub cube are all the even permutations of
$$\left(\pm 1, \pm \frac{1}{t}, \pm t \right),$$
with an even number of plus signs, along with all the odd permutations with an odd number of plus signs, where $t \approx 1.83929$ is the tribonacci constant. Taking the even permutations with an odd number of plus signs, and the odd permutations with an even number of plus signs, gives a different snub cube, the mirror image. Taking them together yields the compound of two snub cubes.

This snub cube has edges of length $\alpha = \sqrt{2+4t-2t^2}$, a number which satisfies the equation
$$\alpha^6-4\alpha^4+16\alpha^2-32=0,$$
and can be written as
$$\begin{align} \alpha &= \sqrt{\frac{4}{3}-\frac{16}{3\beta}+\frac{2\beta}{3}}\approx1.609\,72 \\ \beta &= \sqrt[3]{26+6\sqrt{33}}. \end{align}$$
To get a snub cube with unit edge length, divide all the coordinates above by the value α given above.

== Properties ==
3D model of a snub cube and its mirror

The snub cube is an Archimedean solid, meaning it is a highly symmetric and semi-regular polyhedron, and two or more different regular polygonal faces meet in a vertex. It is chiral, meaning there are two distinct forms whenever being mirrored. Therefore, the snub cube has the rotational octahedral symmetry $\mathrm{O}$. The polygonal faces that meet for every vertex are four equilateral triangles and one square, and the vertex figure of a snub cube is $3^4 \cdot 4$. The dual polyhedron of a snub cube is pentagonal icositetrahedron, a Catalan solid. This is also chiral: In the notation of David McCooey for the two chiral forms of each polyhedron, the dual of a dextro snub cube is a laevo pentagonal icositetrahedron and the dual of a laevo snub cube is a dextro pentagonal icositetrahedron.

For a snub cube with edge length $a$, whether the form is left- or right-chiral, its surface area $A$ and volume $V$ are:
$$A = \left(6+8\sqrt{3}\right)a^2 \approx 19.856a^2, \qquad V = \frac{8t+6}{3\sqrt{2(t^2-3)}}a^3 \approx 7.889a^3.$$

The circumscribed radius $r_\text{c}$ (the radius of a sphere tangent to the vertices) and the midscribed radius $r_\text{m}$ (the radius of a sphere tangent to the edges) of a snub cube are formulated in terms of the tribonacci constant:
$$r_\text{c} = \frac{1}{2}\sqrt{t^3 +1}, \quad r_\text{m} =\frac{1}{2} \sqrt{t^3}.$$
The snub cube has a square radius center $r_4$ and a triangle radius center $r_3$, formulated as:
$$r_4 = \frac12 \sqrt{t^3 -1}, \quad r_3 =\tfrac12 \sqrt{t^3 -\tfrac13 }.$$
The snub cube has two dihedral angles (an angle that is formed by two polygonal faces). Respectively, these angles are formed by a square and a triangle and two adjacent triangles
$$\arccos\left( \frac{1}{\sqrt{3}} (2 -t^2) \right), \quad \arccos\left( \tfrac13 (1 -2t) \right).$$

A snub cube has a subtended angle by an edge from the center
$$\arccos\left( (t^2 -2)^{-1} \right).$$

== Graph ==
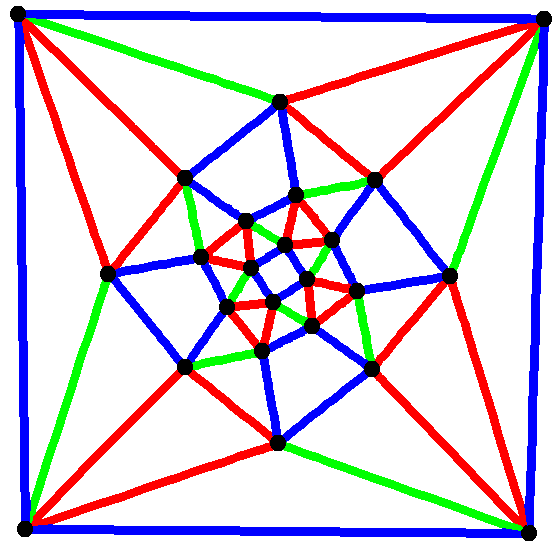
The graph of a snub cube

The skeleton of a snub cube can be represented as a graph with 24 vertices and 60 edges, an Archimedean graph.

== Appearance ==
A snub cube is at the fountain of California Institute of Technology.

In the study of supramolecular chemistry, the snub cube is an application of an artificial polyhedron to mimic the structure of viral capsids and a protein of ferritin.
