= Table of polyhedron dihedral angles =

The dihedral angles for the edge-transitive polyhedra are:

Picture	Name	Schläfli symbol	Vertex/Face configuration	exact dihedral angle (radians)	dihedral angle – exact in bold, else approximate (degrees)
Platonic solids (regular convex)
	Tetrahedron	{3,3}	(3.3.3)	$\arccos(\frac{1}{3})$	70.529°
	Cube	{4,3}	(4.4.4)	$\arccos(0)=\frac{\pi}{2}$	**90°**
	Octahedron	{3,4}	(3.3.3.3)	$\arccos(-\frac{1}{3})$	109.471°
	Dodecahedron	{5,3}	(5.5.5)	$\arccos(-\frac{\sqrt{5}}{5})$	116.565°
	Icosahedron	{3,5}	(3.3.3.3.3)	$\arccos(-\frac{\sqrt{5}}{3})$	138.190°
Kepler–Poinsot polyhedra (regular nonconvex)
	Small stellated dodecahedron	{5/2,5}	(5/2.5/2.5/2.5/2.5/2)	$\arccos(-\frac{\sqrt{5}}{5})$	116.565°
	Great dodecahedron	{5,5/2}	(5.5.5.5.5)/2	$\arccos(\frac{\sqrt{5}}{5})$	63.435°
	Great stellated dodecahedron	{5/2,3}	(5/2.5/2.5/2)	$\arccos(\frac{\sqrt{5}}{5})$	63.435°
	Great icosahedron	{3,5/2}	(3.3.3.3.3)/2	$\arccos(\frac{\sqrt{5}}{3})$	41.810°
Quasiregular polyhedra (Rectified regular)
	Tetratetrahedron	r{3,3}	(3.3.3.3)	$\arccos(-\frac{1}{3})$	109.471°
	Cuboctahedron	r{3,4}	(3.4.3.4)	$\arccos(-\frac{\sqrt{3}}{3})$	125.264°
	Icosidodecahedron	r{3,5}	(3.5.3.5)	$\arccos{(-\frac{1}{15}\sqrt{75+30\sqrt{5}})}$	142.623°
	Dodecadodecahedron	r{5/2,5}	(5.5/2.5.5/2)	$\arccos(-\frac{\sqrt{5}}{5})$	116.565°
	Great icosidodecahedron	r{5/2,3}	(3.5/2.3.5/2)	$\arccos{(\frac{1}{15}\sqrt{75+30\sqrt{5}})}$	37.377°
Ditrigonal polyhedra
	Small ditrigonal icosidodecahedron	a{5,3}	(3.5/2.3.5/2.3.5/2)	$\arccos{(-\frac{1}{15}\sqrt{75+30\sqrt{5}})}$	142.623°
	Ditrigonal dodecadodecahedron	b{5,5/2}	(5.5/3.5.5/3.5.5/3)	$\arccos(\frac{\sqrt{5}}{5})$	63.435°
	Great ditrigonal icosidodecahedron	c{3,5/2}	(3.5.3.5.3.5)/2	$\arccos{(\frac{1}{15}\sqrt{75-30\sqrt{5}})}$	79.188°
Hemipolyhedra
	Tetrahemihexahedron	o{3,3}	(3.4.3/2.4)	$\arccos(\frac{\sqrt{3}}{3})$	54.736°
	Cubohemioctahedron	o{3,4}	(4.6.4/3.6)	$\arccos(\frac{\sqrt{3}}{3})$	54.736°
	Octahemioctahedron	o{4,3}	(3.6.3/2.6)	$\arccos(\frac{1}{3})$	70.529°
	Small dodecahemidodecahedron	o{3,5}	(5.10.5/4.10)	$\arccos{(\frac{1}{15} \sqrt{195-6\sqrt{5}})}$	26.058°
	Small icosihemidodecahedron	o{5,3}	(3.10.3/2.10)	$\arccos(-\frac{\sqrt{5}}{5})$	116.565°
	Great dodecahemicosahedron	o{5/2,5}	(5.6.5/4.6)	$\arccos{(\frac{1}{15}\sqrt{75+30\sqrt{5}})}$	37.377°
	Small dodecahemicosahedron	o{5,5/2}	(5/2.6.5/3.6)	$\arccos{(\frac{1}{15}\sqrt{75-30\sqrt{5}})}$	79.188°
	Great icosihemidodecahedron	o{5/2,3}	(3.10/3.3/2.10/3)	$\arccos{(\frac{1}{15}\sqrt{75+30\sqrt{5}})}$	37.377°
	Great dodecahemidodecahedron	o{3,5/2}	(5/2.10/3.5/3.10/3)	$\arccos(\frac{\sqrt{5}}{5})$	63.435°
Quasiregular dual solids
	Rhombic hexahedron (Dual of tetratetrahedron)	—	V(3.3.3.3)	$\arccos(0)=\frac{\pi}{2}$	**90°**
	Rhombic dodecahedron (Dual of cuboctahedron)	—	V(3.4.3.4)	$\arccos(-\frac{1}{2})=\frac{2\pi}{3}$	**120°**
	Rhombic triacontahedron (Dual of icosidodecahedron)	—	V(3.5.3.5)	$\arccos(-\frac{\sqrt{5}+1}{4})=\frac{4\pi}{5}$	**144°**
	Medial rhombic triacontahedron (Dual of dodecadodecahedron)	—	V(5.5/2.5.5/2)	$\arccos(-\frac{1}{2})=\frac{2\pi}{3}$	**120°**
	Great rhombic triacontahedron (Dual of great icosidodecahedron)	—	V(3.5/2.3.5/2)	$\arccos(\frac{\sqrt{5}-1}{4})=\frac{2\pi}{5}$	**72°**
Duals of the ditrigonal polyhedra
	Small triambic icosahedron (Dual of small ditrigonal icosidodecahedron)	—	V(3.5/2.3.5/2.3.5/2)	$\arccos(-\frac{1}{3})$	109.471°
	Medial triambic icosahedron (Dual of ditrigonal dodecadodecahedron)	—	V(5.5/3.5.5/3.5.5/3)	$\arccos(-\frac{1}{3})$	109.471°
	Great triambic icosahedron (Dual of great ditrigonal icosidodecahedron)	—	V(3.5.3.5.3.5)/2	$\arccos(-\frac{1}{3})$	109.471°
Duals of the hemipolyhedra
	Tetrahemihexacron (Dual of tetrahemihexahedron)	—	V(3.4.3/2.4)	$\pi-\frac{\pi}{2}$	**90°**
	Hexahemioctacron (Dual of cubohemioctahedron)	—	V(4.6.4/3.6)	$\pi-\frac{\pi}{3}$	**120°**
	Octahemioctacron (Dual of octahemioctahedron)	—	V(3.6.3/2.6)	$\pi-\frac{\pi}{3}$	**120°**
	Small dodecahemidodecacron (Dual of small dodecahemidodecacron)	—	V(5.10.5/4.10)	$\pi-\frac{\pi}{5}$	**144°**
	Small icosihemidodecacron (Dual of small icosihemidodecacron)	—	V(3.10.3/2.10)	$\pi-\frac{\pi}{5}$	**144°**
	Great dodecahemicosacron (Dual of great dodecahemicosahedron)	—	V(5.6.5/4.6)	$\pi-\frac{\pi}{3}$	**120°**
	Small dodecahemicosacron (Dual of small dodecahemicosahedron)	—	V(5/2.6.5/3.6)	$\pi-\frac{\pi}{3}$	**120°**
	Great icosihemidodecacron (Dual of great icosihemidodecacron)	—	V(3.10/3.3/2.10/3)	$\pi-\frac{2\pi}{5}$	**72°**
	Great dodecahemidodecacron (Dual of great dodecahemidodecacron)	—	V(5/2.10/3.5/3.10/3)	$\pi-\frac{2\pi}{5}$	**72°**
