= List of polyhedral stellations =

In three-dimensional space, applying the operation of stellation to a polyhedron extends its faces (or edges and planes) until they generate new vertices that bound a newly formed figure. Stellation represents the dual action to faceting a polyhedron.

Originating from studies of star polyhedra in 14th century Europe, a proper mathematical account of polyhedral stellations was given by Johannes Kepler in his 1619 classic work, Harmonices Mundi. Progress later ensued on detailing and enumerating stellations of prominent stars, such as the regular Kepler-Poinsot polyhedra, with developments on different stellation methods occurring in the 1900s, principally from Coxeter et al. (1938) and soon afterward, Pawley (1975).

A short generalized table of the most notable polyhedral stellations belonging to convex uniform polyhedra is provided, with complete sets of stellations for the Platonic solids (including the fifty-nine icosahedral stellations), as well as for select Catalan solids (e.g., the rhombic dodecahedron and the rhombic triacontahedron). Stellations of non-convex uniform polyhedra of structure with facial planes passing through their centers (i.e., hemipolyhedral), which render unbounded vertices, are also included; these are stellations to infinity — per Wenninger (1983) — conforming to extensions on traditional definitions of polyhedra.

== Background ==
=== Star polytopes ===
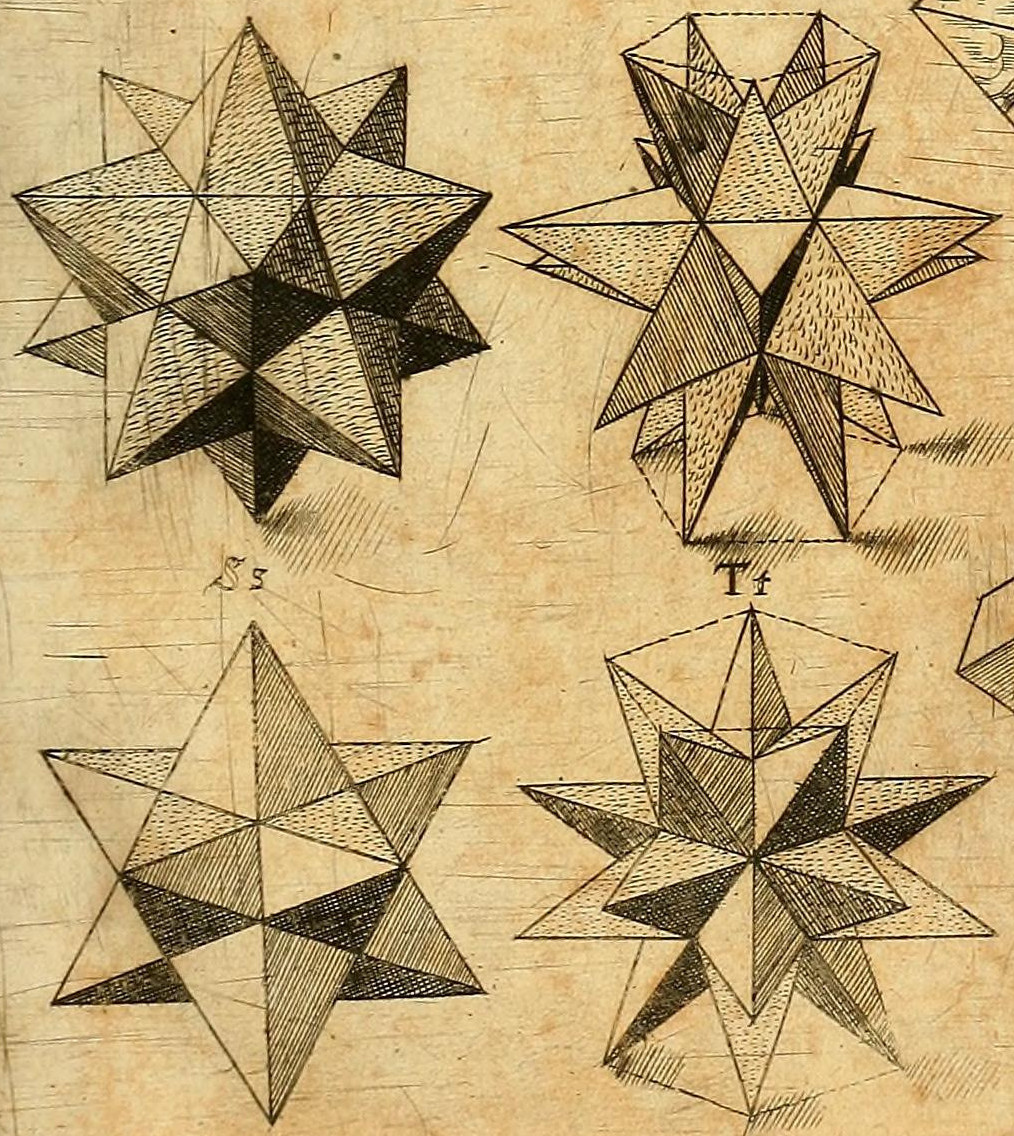
The small stellated dodecahedron (left), and great stellated dodecahedron (right), as found in Harmonices Mundi by Johannes Kepler.

Experimentation with star polygons and star polyhedra since the fourteenth century AD led the way to formal theories for stellating polyhedra:

- 14th c. AD: Thomas Bradwardine was the first to detail studies of star polygons by extending the sides of polygons.
- 15th – 16th c.: Charles de Bovelles became the first to study star polyhedra.
- 1509: Luca Pacioli publishes Divina proportione, featuring woodcut illustrations by Leonardo da Vinci of various polyhedra, including "elevated" polyhedra that have been augmented by attaching pyramids to faces, as showcased with the stellated octahedron. (Note: More specifically, Pacioli's "elevation" of polyhedra involved truncating (or rectifying) the Platonic solids, after-which pyramids of different bases are systematically attached to faces of the polyhedra (akin to kleetopes, augmenting them into a "star-like" polyhedron). In this same work, da Vinci illustrates a concaved triakis icosahedron, which shares its outer shell with the great stellated dodecahedron.)
- 1568: Wenzel Jamnitzer publishes Perspectiva Corporum Regularium, with ink engravings on paper of different polyhedra, such as figures closely resembling the great stellated dodecahedron and the great dodecahedron, both stellations of the regular dodecahedron.

It was in 1619 that the first geometric description of a stellation was given, by Johannes Kepler in his landmark book, Harmonices Mundi: the process of extending the edges (or faces) of a figure until new vertices are generated, which collectively form a new figure. (Note: Kepler (1997, Book I: II. Definitions; p. 17) defines a star polygon via stellation of a convex polygon: "Some of these [figures] are primary and basic, not extending beyond their boundaries, and it is to these that the previous definition properly applies: others are augmented, as if it were extending beyond their sides, and if two non-neighboring sides of one of the basic figures are produced they meet [to form a vertex of the augmented figure]: these are called Stars.") Using this method, Kepler was able to discover the small stellated dodecahedron and the great stellated dodecahedron. In 1809, Louis Poinsot rediscovered Kepler's star figures and discovered a further two, the great icosahedron and great dodecahedron; he achieved this by experimenting assembling regular star polygons and convex regular polygons on vertices of the regular icosahedron and dodecahedron (i.e., pentagons, pentagrams and equilateral triangles). Three years later, Augustin-Louis Cauchy proved, using concepts of symmetry, that these four stellations are the only regular star-polyhedra, eventually termed the Kepler–Poinsot polyhedra. As with most non-convex polyhedra including stellations and other star polyhedra, the Kepler-Poinsot polyhedra, with regular self-intersecting faces, are now known to be inequivalent to the topological sphere as a simple connected surface (this is in contrast with the traditional convex uniform polyhedra and their corresponding homotopy invariance). (Note: See also, Euler characteristic § Homotopy invariance.)

=== Stellation process ===
Coxeter et al. (1938) details, for the first time, all stellations of the regular icosahedron with specific rules proposed by J. C. P. Miller. Generalizing these (Miller's rules) for stellating any uniform polyhedron yields the following:

- The faces must lie in face-planes, i.e., the bounding planes of the regular solid.
- All parts composing the faces must be the same in each plane, although they may be quite disconnected.
- The parts included in any one plane must be symmetric about corresponding point groups, without or with reflection. This secures polyhedral symmetry for the whole solid.
- All parts included in planes must be "accessible" in the completed solid (i.e. they must be on the "outside").
- Cases where the parts can be divided into two sets, each giving a solid with as much symmetry as the whole figure, are excluded from consideration; combination of enantiomorphous pairs having no common part (which actually occurs in just one case) are included.

These rules are ideal for stellating smaller uniform solids, such as the regular polyhedra; however, when assessing stellations of other larger uniform polyhedra, this method can quickly become overwhelming. (For example, there are a total of 358,833,072 stellations to the rhombic triacontahedron using this set of rules.) To address this, Pawley (1973) proposed a set of rules that restrict the number of stellations to a more manageable set of fully supported stellations that are radially convex, such that an outward ray from the center of the original polyhedron (in any direction) crosses the stellation surface only once (that is to say, all visible parts of a face are seen from the same side). (Note: McKeown & Badler (1980) presented an early computer algorithm to generate and visualize stellations of convex polyhedra, as for the 227 stellations of the rhombic triacontahedron that Pawley (1975) formally described.)

In the 1948 first edition of Regular Polytopes, H. S. M. Coxeter describes the stellation process as the reciprocal action to faceting, identifying the four Kepler-Poinsot polyhedra as stellations and facetings of the regular dodecahedron and icosahedron. He specifies the construction of a star polyhedron as a stellation of its core (with congruent face-planes), or by faceting its case — the former requires the addition of solid pieces that generate new vertices, while the latter involves the removal of solid pieces, without forming any new vertices (the core of a star polyhedron or compound is the largest convex solid that can be drawn inside them, while their case is the smallest convex solid that contains them).

== Lists ==
Lists for polyhedral stellations contain non-convex polyhedra; some of the most notable examples include:

- Kepler-Poinsot polyhedra (W20, W21, W22, and W41/C7)
- Regular compound polyhedra (W19, W2/C3, W24/C47, W25/C22, UC_{9}) and
- Platonic or Kepler-Poinsot compound dual polyhedra (W19, W47, W61, W43, and the great icosahedron and great stellated dodecahedron compound)

Stellations that topologically do not fit into standard definitions of uniform polyhedra are listed further down (i.e. stellations of hemipolyhedra).

Notable stellations of various polyhedra
| Image | Name | Stellation core | Face diagram | Refs. | Notes |
|---|---|---|---|---|---|
| | Great dodecahedron | Regular dodecahedron | | W21 | *, ¶ |
| | Great stellated dodecahedron | Regular dodecahedron | | W22 | *, ¶ |
| | Small stellated dodecahedron | Regular dodecahedron | | W20 | * |
| | Great icosahedron | Regular icosahedron | | W41, C7 | * |
| | Stella octangula (compound of two tetrahedra) | Regular octahedron | | W19 | † (‡), ¶ |
| | Compound of five tetrahedra | Regular icosahedron | | W24, C47 | † |
| | Compound of ten tetrahedra | Regular icosahedron | | W25, C22 | † |
| | Compound of five octahedra | Regular icosahedron | | W2, C3 | † |
| | Compound of five cubes | Rhombic triacontahedron | | | † |
| | Compound of cube and octahedron | Cuboctahedron | | W43 | ‡, ¶ |
| | Compound of dodecahedron and icosahedron | Icosidodecahedron | | W47 | ‡, ¶ |
| | Compound of great icosahedron and great stellated dodecahedron | Icosidodecahedron | | W61 | ‡ |
| | Compound of great dodecahedron and small stellated dodecahedron | Icosidodecahedron | | | ‡ |
| | Small triambic icosahedron | Regular icosahedron | | W1, C2 | ¶ |
| | Final stellation of the icosahedron | Regular icosahedron | | W13, C8 | ¶ |
| | First stellation of the rhombic dodecahedron | Rhombic dodecahedron | | | ¶ |

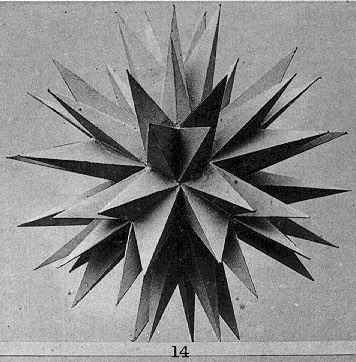
Final stellation of the icosahedron, as represented by Max Brückner in his 1900 book, Vielecke und Vielflache: Theorie und Geschichte

KEY

* Kepler-Poinsot polyhedron (star polyhedron with regular facets)
† Regular compound polyhedron (vertex, edge, and face-transitive compound)
‡ Compound of dual regular polyhedra (Platonic or Kepler-Poinsot duals)
¶ First/outermost stellation of stellation core

"Stellation core" describes a stellated regular (Platonic), semi-regular (Archimedean), or dual to a semi-regular (Catalan) figure.
"Face diagram" represents the lines of intersection from extended polyhedral edges that are used in the stellation process.
"Refs." (references) such as indexes found in Coxeter et al. (1999) using the Crennells' illustration notation (C), and Wenninger (1989) (W).

=== Enumerations ===
The table below is adapted from research by Robert Webb, using his program Stella. It enumerates fully supported stellations and stellations per Miller's process, of the regular Platonic solids as well as the semi-regular Archimedean solids and their Catalan duals. In this list, the elongated square gyrobicupola and its dual polyhedron are not included (these are sometimes considered a fourteenth Archimedean and Catalan solid, respectively). The base polyhedron stellation core is included as a zeroth convex stellation following the Crennells' indexing, with stellation totals the sum of chiral and reflexible stellations (a "chiral" stellation is enantiomorphous, while a "reflexible" stellation maintains the same group symmetry as its stellation core, yet remains achiral – for a count of these separately, visit the parent source).

Stellation totals of convex polyhedra by group symmetry and order (T_{d}, O_{h}, I_{h})
| ▼ | Polyhedron | Cell types | Fully supported stellations | Miller stellations |
|---|---|---|---|---|
| P L A T O N I C | Tetrahedron | 1 | 1 | 1 |
| P L A T O N I C | Cube | 1 | 1 | 1 |
| P L A T O N I C | Octahedron | 2 | 2 | 2 |
| P L A T O N I C | Dodecahedron | 4 | 4 | 4 |
| P L A T O N I C | Icosahedron | 11 | 18 | 59 |
| A R C H I M E D E A N | Truncated tetrahedron | 4 | 6 | 10 |
| A R C H I M E D E A N | Cuboctahedron | 8 | 13 | 21 |
| A R C H I M E D E A N | Truncated octahedron | 9 | 18 | 45 |
| A R C H I M E D E A N | Truncated cube | 9 | 18 | 45 |
| A R C H I M E D E A N | Rhombicuboctahedron | 48 | 18827 | ? (128723453647 reflexible) |
| A R C H I M E D E A N | Truncated cuboctahedron | 49 | 22632 | ? (317650001638 reflexible) |
| A R C H I M E D E A N | Snub cube | 274 | 299050957776 | ? |
| A R C H I M E D E A N | Icosidodecahedron | 41 | 847 | 70841855109 |
| A R C H I M E D E A N | Truncated icosahedron | 45 | 1117 | 3082649548558 |
| A R C H I M E D E A N | Truncated dodecahedron | 45 | 1141 | 2645087084526 |
| A R C H I M E D E A N | Rhombicosidodecahedron | 273 | 298832037395 | ? |
| A R C H I M E D E A N | Truncated icosidodecahedron | 294 | 1016992138164 | ? |
| A R C H I M E D E A N | Snub dodecahedron | 1940 | ? (579 reflexible) | ? |
| C A T A L A N | Triakis tetrahedron | 9 | 21 | 188 |
| C A T A L A N | Rhombic dodecahedron | 4 | 4 | 5 |
| C A T A L A N | Tetrakis hexahedron | 10 | 1762 | 143383367876 |
| C A T A L A N | Triakis octahedron | 32 | 3083 | 218044256331 |
| C A T A L A N | Deltoidal icositetrahedron | 32 | 1201 | 253811894971 |
| C A T A L A N | Disdyakis dodecahedron | 292 | ? (14728897413 reflexible) | ? |
| C A T A L A N | Pentagonal icositetrahedron | 69 | 72621 | ? |
| C A T A L A N | Rhombic triacontahedron | 29 | 227 | 358833098 (Note: 358833072 from earlier sources, and extending to 358833106 per a deeper analysis by Webb of Miller's fifth rule.) |
| C A T A L A N | Pentakis dodecahedron | 253 | 71112946668 | ? |
| C A T A L A N | Triakis icosahedron | 241 | 13902332663 | ? |
| C A T A L A N | Deltoidal hexecontahedron | 226 | 7146284014 | ? |
| C A T A L A N | Disdyakis triacontahedron | 2033 | ? (~ 10^{12} reflexible) | ? |
| C A T A L A N | Pentagonal hexecontahedron | 536 | 30049378413796 | ? |

"Cell types" are sets of symmetrically equivalent stellation cells, where "stellation cells" are the minimal 3D spaces enclosed on all sides by the original polyhedron's extended facial planes.
"?" denotes an unknown total number of stellations; however, the number of reflexible stellations are sometimes known for these (where chiral stellations are excluded).

== Stellations of Platonic solids ==
Only three of the five Platonic solids produce stellations: the regular octahedron, regular dodecahedron, and regular icosahedron. The regular tetrahedron and cube are unable to generate stellations when extending their faces, since extending their vertices only form one possible convex hull.

=== Stellations of the octahedron ===
The stella octangula (or stellated octahedron) is the only stellation of the regular octahedron. This stellation is made of self-dual tetrahedra, as the simplest regular polyhedral compound:

| Figure | Stellation |
|---|---|
| Regular octahedron | Compound of two tetrahedra stella octangula |
deltahedra, antiprisms

=== Stellations of the dodecahedron ===
All stellations of the regular dodecahedron are Kepler-Poinsot polyhedra:

Stellations of the regular dodecahedron
| Platonic solid | Kepler–Poinsot solids | | |
|---|---|---|---|
| Regular dodecahedron | Small stellated dodecahedron | Great dodecahedron | Great stellated dodecahedron |

=== Stellations of the icosahedron ===
This is the stellation diagram of the regular icosahedron, with face sets labelled, 0-13.

Coxeter et al. (1938) detailed the stellations of the regular icosahedron with rules proposed by J. C. P. Miller. As found in Coxeter et al. (1999), the following table lists all stellations of the icosahedron per the Crennells' indexing (in it, the regular icosahedron (or snub octahedron) stellation core is indexed as "1"):

Stellations of the regular icosahedron
| Crennell | Cells | Faces | Figure | Face diagram |
|---|---|---|---|---|
| 1 | A | 0 | | |
| 2 | B | 1 | | |
| 3 | C | 2 | | |
| 4 | D | 3 4 | | |
| 5 | E | 5 6 7 | | |
| 6 | F | 8 9 10 | | |
| 7 | G | 11 12 | | |
| 8 | H | 13 | | |
| 9 | e_{1} | 3' 5 | | |
| 10 | f_{1} | 5' 6' 9 10 | | |
| 11 | g_{1} | 10' 12 | | |
| 12 | e_{1}f_{1} | 3' 6' 9 10 | | |
| 13 | e_{1}f_{1}g_{1} | 3' 6' 9 12 | | |
| 14 | f_{1}g_{1} | 5' 6' 9 12 | | |
| 15 | e_{2} | 4' 6 7 | | |
| 16 | f_{2} | 7' 8 | | |
| 17 | g_{2} | 8' 9'11 | | |
| 18 | e_{2}f_{2} | 4' 6 8 | | |
| 19 | e_{2}f_{2}g_{2} | 4' 6 9' 11 | | |
| 20 | f_{2}g_{2} | 7' 9' 11 | | |
| 21 | De_{1} | 4 5 | | |
| 22 | Ef_{1} | 7 9 10 | | |
| 23 | Fg_{1} | 8 9 12 | | |
| 24 | De_{1}f_{1} | 4 6' 9 10 | | |
| 25 | De_{1}f_{1}g_{1} | 4 6' 9 12 | | |
| 26 | Ef_{1}g_{1} | 7 9 12 | | |
| 27 | De_{2} | 3 6 7 | | |
| 28 | Ef_{2} | 5 6 8 | | |
| 29 | Fg_{2} | 10 11 | | |
| 30 | De_{2}f_{2} | 3 6 8 | | |
| 31 | De_{2}f_{2}g_{2} | 3 6 9' 11 | | |
| 32 | Ef_{2}g_{2} | 5 6 9' 11 | | |
| 33 | f_{1} | 5' 6' 9 10 | | |
| 34 | e_{1}f_{1} | 3' 5 6' 9 10 | | |
| 35 | De_{1}f_{1} | 4 5 6' 9 10 | | |
| 36 | f_{1}g_{1} | 5' 6' 9 10' 12 | | |
| 37 | e_{1}f_{1}g_{1} | 3' 5 6' 9 10' 12 | | |
| 38 | De_{1}f_{1}g_{1} | 4 5 6' 9 10' 12 | | |
| 39 | f_{1}g_{2} | 5' 6' 8' 9' 10 11 | | |
| 40 | e_{1}f_{1}g_{2} | 3' 5 6' 8' 9' 10 11 | | |
| 41 | De_{1}f_{1}g_{2} | 4 5 6' 8' 9' 10 11 | | |
| 42 | f_{1}f_{2}g_{2} | 5' 6' 7' 9' 10 11 | | |
| 43 | e_{1}f_{1}f_{2}g_{2} | 3' 5 6' 7' 9' 10 11 | | |
| 44 | De_{1}f_{1}f_{2}g_{2} | 4 5 6' 7' 9' 10 11 | | |
| 45 | e_{2}f_{1} | 4' 5' 6 7 9 10 | | |
| 46 | De_{2}f_{1} | 3 5' 6 7 9 10 | | |
| 47 | Ef_{1} | 5 6 7 9 10 | | |
| 48 | e_{2}f_{1}g_{1} | 4' 5' 6 7 9 10' 12 | | |
| 49 | De_{2}f_{1}g_{1} | 3 5' 6 7 9 10' 12 | | |
| 50 | Ef_{1}g_{1} | 5 6 7 9 10' 12 | | |
| 51 | e_{2}f_{1}f_{2} | 4' 5' 6 8 9 10 | | |
| 52 | De_{2}f_{1}f_{2} | 3 5' 6 8 9 10 | | |
| 53 | Ef_{1}f_{2} | 5 6 8 9 10 | | |
| 54 | e_{2}f_{1}f_{2}g_{1} | 4' 5' 6 8 9 10' 12 | | |
| 55 | De_{2}f_{1}f_{2}g_{1} | 3 5' 6 8 9 10' 12 | | |
| 56 | Ef_{1}f_{2}g_{1} | 5 6 8 9 10' 12 | | |
| 57 | e_{2}f_{1}f_{2}g_{2} | 4' 5' 6 9' 10 11 | | |
| 58 | De_{2}f_{1}f_{2}g_{2} | 3 5' 6 9' 10 11 | | |
| 59 | Ef_{1}f_{2}g_{2} | 5 6 9' 10 11 | | |

"Cells" (du Val notation) correspond to the internal congruent spaces formed by extending face-planes of the regular icosahedron.

A subset of these are illustrated in Wenninger (1989), alongside constructions for physical models (W19–W66).

== Stellations of Catalan solids ==
=== Stellations of the rhombic dodecahedron ===
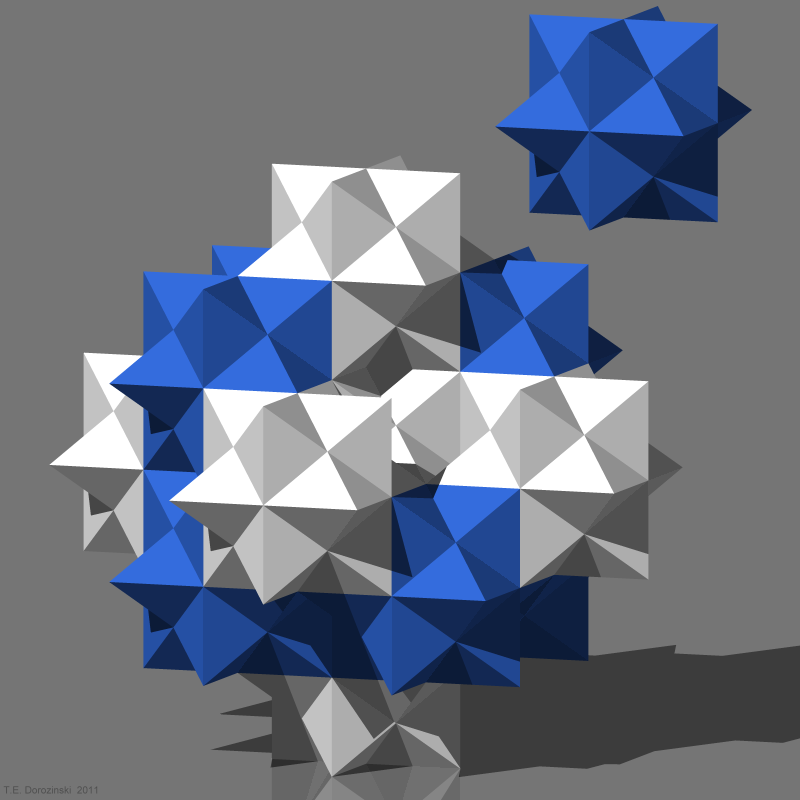
Escher's solid, or the first stellation of the rhombic dodecahedron, tessellates three-dimensional space with copies of itself.

The rhombic dodecahedron produces three fully supported stellations, described in Luke (1957):

Rhombic dodecahedron stellations
| Stellation | Figure | Face diagram |
|---|---|---|
| Rhombic dodecahedron | | |
| First stellation of the rhombic dodecahedron | | |
| Second stellation of the rhombic dodecahedron | | |
| Final stellation of the rhombic dodecahedron | | |

An additional fourth stellation is possible under Miller's rules. The first stellation of the rhombic dodecahedron is notable for being able to form a honeycomb in three-dimensional space, using copies of itself.

=== Stellations of the rhombic triacontahedron ===
Pawley (1975) shows the rhombic triacontahedron produces 227 fully supported stellations, including the rhombic triacontahedron itself. Some of these are shown in the table below:

Select stellations to the rhombic triacontahedron
| Stellation | Figure | Face diagram |
|---|---|---|
| Rhombic triacontahedron | | |
| First stellation of the rhombic triacontahedron | | |
| Medial rhombic triacontahedron | | |
| Rhombic hexecontahedron | | |
| Compound of five cubes | | |
| Great rhombic triacontahedron | | |
| Final stellation of the rhombic triacontahedron | | |

Of these, the compound of five cubes is notable for being a regular compound polyhedron. The medial rhombic triacontahedron and the great rhombic triacontahedron are also notable for being star (non-convex) isotoxal polyhedra.

== Hemipolychrons ==
In Wenninger (1983), a unique family of stellations with unbounded vertices are identified. These originate from orthogonal edges of faces that pass through centers of their corresponding dual hemipolyhedra. The following is a list of these stellations; specifically, of non-convex uniform hemipolyhedra (with coincidental figures in parentheses):

Stellations to infinity
| Image | Name | Dual figure | Stellation core |
|---|---|---|---|
| | Tetrahemihexacron | Tetrahemihexahedron | Cube |
| | Octahemioctacron (hexahemioctacron) | Octahemioctahedron (cubohemioctahedron) | Rhombic dodecahedron |
| | Small icosihemidodecacron (small dodecahemidodecacron) | Small icosihemidodecahedron (small dodecahemidodecahedron) | Rhombic triacontahedron |
| | Great dodecahemidodecacron (great icosihemidodecacron) | Great dodecahemidodecahedron (great icosihemidodecahedron) | Rhombic triacontahedron |
| | Great dodecahemicosacron (small dodecahemicosacron) | Great dodecahemicosahedron (small icosihemidodecahedron) | Rhombic triacontahedron |
| | Great dirhombicosidodecacron (great disnub dirhombidodecacron) | Great dirhombicosidodecahedron (great disnub dirhombidodecahedron) | Deltoidal hexecontahedron |

This family of stellations does not strictly fulfill the definition of a polyhedron that is bound by vertices, and Wenninger notes that at the limit their facets can be interpreted as forming unbounded elongated pyramids, or equivalently, prisms (indistinguishably). As with their dual polyhedra, these hemipolyhedral stellations are isotoxal polyhedra (in their case, at infinity). The final polyhedron on this list, the great dirhombicosidodecacron, is the only stellation whose dual figure — the last-indexed and most complex non-degenerate uniform polyhedron, the great dirhombicosidodecahedron (U_{75}) — is constructed using a spherical quadrilateral Wythoff construction (rather than with spherical triangles). (Note: The dual to the great dirhombicosidodecacron is furthermore the only non-degenerate uniform polyhedron that is unable to be constructed using a spherical triangular Wythoff construction; its coincidental figure (the great disnub dirhombidodecacron), on the other hand, is dual to the great disnub dirhombidodecahedron, which is the only degenerate uniform hemipolyhedron, also constructed with quadrilateral Wythoff spherical domains.)

The tetrahemihexacron is the only hemipolycron to lack a coincidental figure arising from duals of distinct hemipolyhedra with common facetings.
