= U62 =

U62 or U-62 may refer to:

- German submarine U-62, various vessels
- HMS Lapwing (U62), a sloop of the Royal Navy
- Small dodecahemicosahedron
- Small nucleolar RNA SNORD62
- U-62, a fictional television station in the film UHF
