= R41 =

R41 may refer to:

- R41 (South Africa), a road
- Fluoromethane, a refrigerant
- HMS Volage (R41), a destroyer of the Royal Navy
- Junkers R41, a German trainer aircraft
- R41: Risk of serious damage to eyes, a risk phrase
- Small nucleolar RNA R41
