= Small icosihemidodecacron =

Star polyhedron

Small icosihemidodecacron
Type	Star polyhedron
Face	—
Elements	F = 30, E = 60; V = 26 (χ = −4)
Symmetry group	I_{h}, [5,3], *532
Index references	DU_{49}
dual polyhedron	Small icosihemidodecahedron

In geometry, the small icosihemidodecacron is the dual of the small icosihemidodecahedron, and is one of nine dual hemipolyhedra. It appears visually indistinct from the small dodecahemidodecacron.

Since the hemipolyhedra have faces passing through the center, the dual figures have corresponding vertices at infinity; properly, on the real projective plane at infinity. In Magnus Wenninger's Dual Models, they are represented with intersecting prisms, each extending in both directions to the same vertex at infinity, in order to maintain symmetry. In practice the model prisms are cut off at a certain point that is convenient for the maker. Wenninger suggested these figures are members of a new class of stellation figures, called stellation to infinity. However, he also suggested that strictly speaking they are not polyhedra because their construction does not conform to the usual definitions.

The small icosihemidodecahedron has six decagonal faces passing through the model center, the small icosihemidodecacron has six vertices at infinity.

== See also ==
- Hemi-dodecahedron - The six vertices at infinity correspond directionally to the six vertices of this abstract polyhedron.
