= Small nucleolar RNA R41 =

Non-coding RNA molecule identified in plants

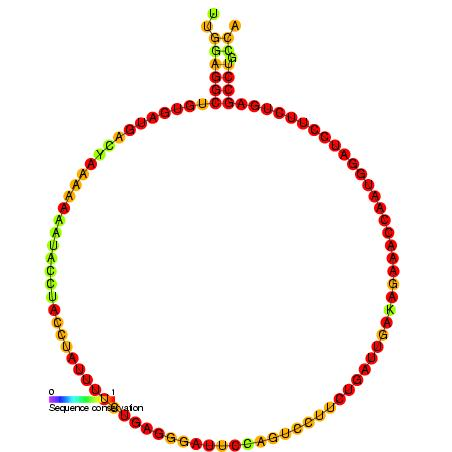
- Predicted secondary structure and sequence conservation of snoR41

Identifiers
- Symbol: snoR41
- Rfam: RF00205

Other data
- RNA type: Gene; snRNA; snoRNA; CD-box
- Domain: Eukaryota
- GO: GO:0006396 GO:0005730
- SO: SO:0000593
- PDB structures: PDBe

In molecular biology, Small nucleolar RNA R41 (also known as snoR41) is a non-coding RNA (ncRNA) molecule identified in plants which functions in the modification of other small nuclear RNAs (snRNAs). This type of modifying RNA is usually located in the nucleolus of the eukaryotic cell which is a major site of snRNA biogenesis. It is known as a small nucleolar RNA (snoRNA) and also often referred to as a guide RNA.

snoR41 belongs to the C/D box class of snoRNAs which contain the conserved sequence motifs known as the C box (UGAUGA) and the D box (CUGA). Most of the members of the box C/D family function in directing site-specific 2'-O-methylation of substrate RNAs.

snoR41 was identified by computational screening the rice Oryza sativa genome and is predicted to act as a methylation guide for 18S and 25S ribosomal RNA (rRNA). snoR41 has been alternatively named snoZ154 and snoZ231 in rice. The 18S methylation site is reported to be homologous to that targeted by U62 in humans but there appears to be little sequence similarity between the two snoRNAs.
