= Great dirhombicosidodecacron =

Polyhedron with 60 faces

Great dirhombicosidodecacron
Type	Star polyhedron
Face	—
Elements	F = 60, E = 240; V = 124 (χ = −56)
Symmetry group	I_{h}, [5,3], *532
Index references	DU_{75}
dual polyhedron	Great dirhombicosidodecahedron

In geometry, the great dirhombicosidodecacron is a nonconvex isohedral polyhedron. It is the dual of the great dirhombicosidodecahedron.

In Magnus Wenninger's Dual Models, it is represented with intersecting infinite prisms passing through the model center, cut off at a certain point that is convenient for the maker. Wenninger suggested these figures are members of a new class of stellation polyhedra, called stellation to infinity. However, he also acknowledged that strictly speaking they are not polyhedra because their construction does not conform to the usual definitions.
