= Antiparallelogram =

Polygon with four crossed edges of two lengths

An antiparallelogram, Diagonals p and q are drawn using dotted lines, and height h is perpendicular to them.

In geometry, an antiparallelogram is a type of self-crossing quadrilateral. Like a parallelogram, an antiparallelogram has two opposite pairs of equal-length sides, but these pairs of sides are not in general parallel. Instead, each pair of sides is antiparallel with respect to the other, with sides in the longer pair crossing each other as in a scissors mechanism. Whereas a parallelogram's opposite angles are equal and oriented the same way, an antiparallelogram's are equal but oppositely oriented. Antiparallelograms are also called contraparallelograms or crossed parallelograms.

Antiparallelograms occur as the vertex figures of certain nonconvex uniform polyhedra. In the theory of four-bar linkages, the linkages with the form of an antiparallelogram are also called butterfly linkages or bow-tie linkages, and are used in the design of non-circular gears. In celestial mechanics, they occur in certain families of solutions to the 4-body problem.

Every antiparallelogram has an axis of symmetry, with all four vertices on a circle. It can be formed from an isosceles trapezoid by adding the two diagonals and removing two parallel sides. The signed area of every antiparallelogram is zero.

== Geometric properties ==
Three circles associated with an antiparallelogram

An antiparallelogram is a special case of a crossed quadrilateral, with two pairs of equal-length edges. In general, crossed quadrilaterals can have unequal edges. Special forms of the antiparallelogram are the crossed rectangles and crossed squares, obtained by replacing two opposite sides of a rectangle or square by the two diagonals. In these shapes, the two uncrossed sides are parallel and equal. Every antiparallelogram is a cyclic quadrilateral, meaning that its four vertices all lie on a single circle. Additionally, the four extended sides of any antiparallelogram are the bitangents of two circles, making antiparallelograms closely related to the tangential quadrilaterals, ex-tangential quadrilaterals, and kites (which are both tangential and ex-tangential).

Every antiparallelogram has an axis of symmetry through its crossing point. Because of this symmetry, it has two pairs of equal angles and two pairs of equal sides. The four midpoints of its sides lie on a line perpendicular to the axis of symmetry; that is, for this kind of quadrilateral, the Varignon parallelogram is a degenerate quadrilateral of area zero, consisting of four collinear points. The convex hull of an antiparallelogram is an isosceles trapezoid, and every antiparallelogram may be formed from an isosceles trapezoid (or its special cases, the rectangles and squares) by replacing two parallel sides by the two diagonals of the trapezoid.

Because an antiparallelogram forms two congruent triangular regions of the plane, but loops around those two regions in opposite directions, its signed area is the difference between the regions' areas and is therefore zero. The polygon's unsigned area (the total area it surrounds) is the sum, rather than the difference, of these areas. For an antiparallelogram with two parallel diagonals of lengths $p$ and $q$, separated by height $h$, this sum is $hpq/(p+q)$. It follows from applying the triangle inequality to these two triangular regions that the crossing pair of edges in an antiparallelogram must always be longer than the two uncrossed edges.

== Applications ==
=== In polyhedra ===
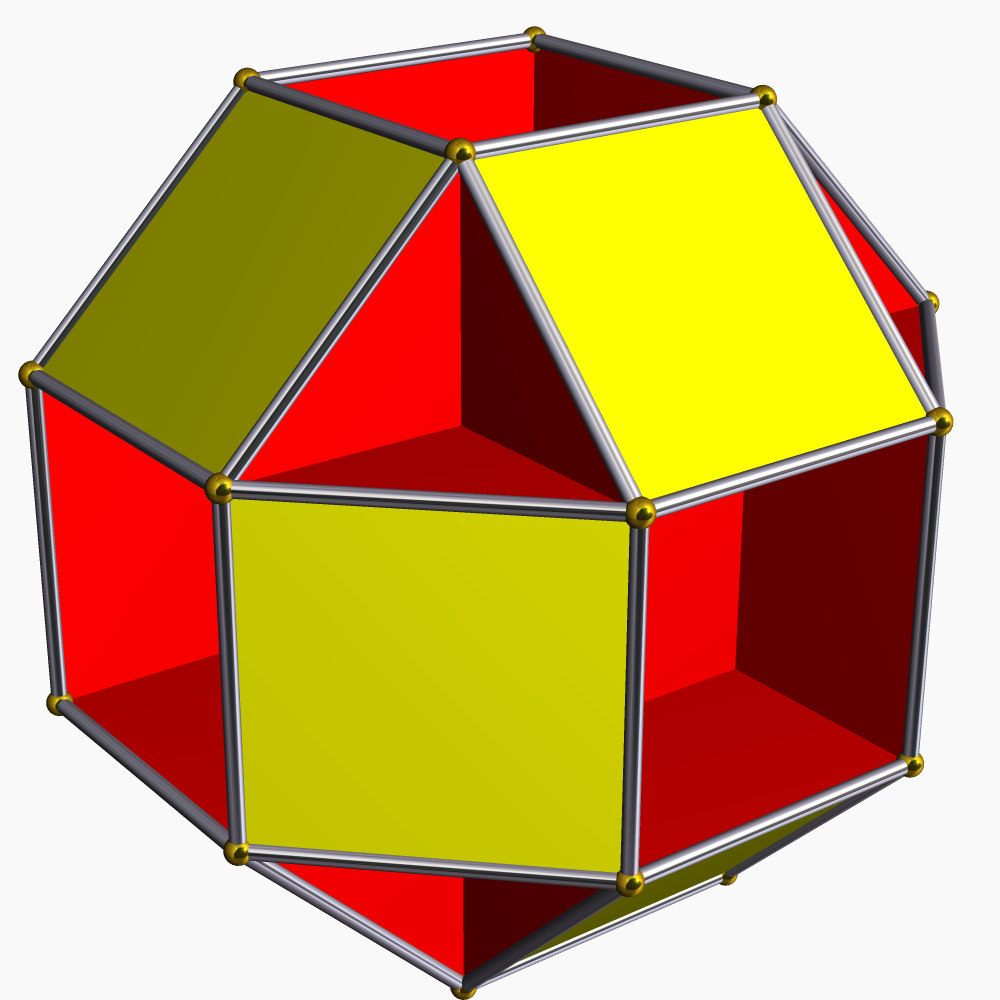
A small rhombihexahedron. Slicing off a vertex gives an antiparallelogram cross-section as the vertex figure.

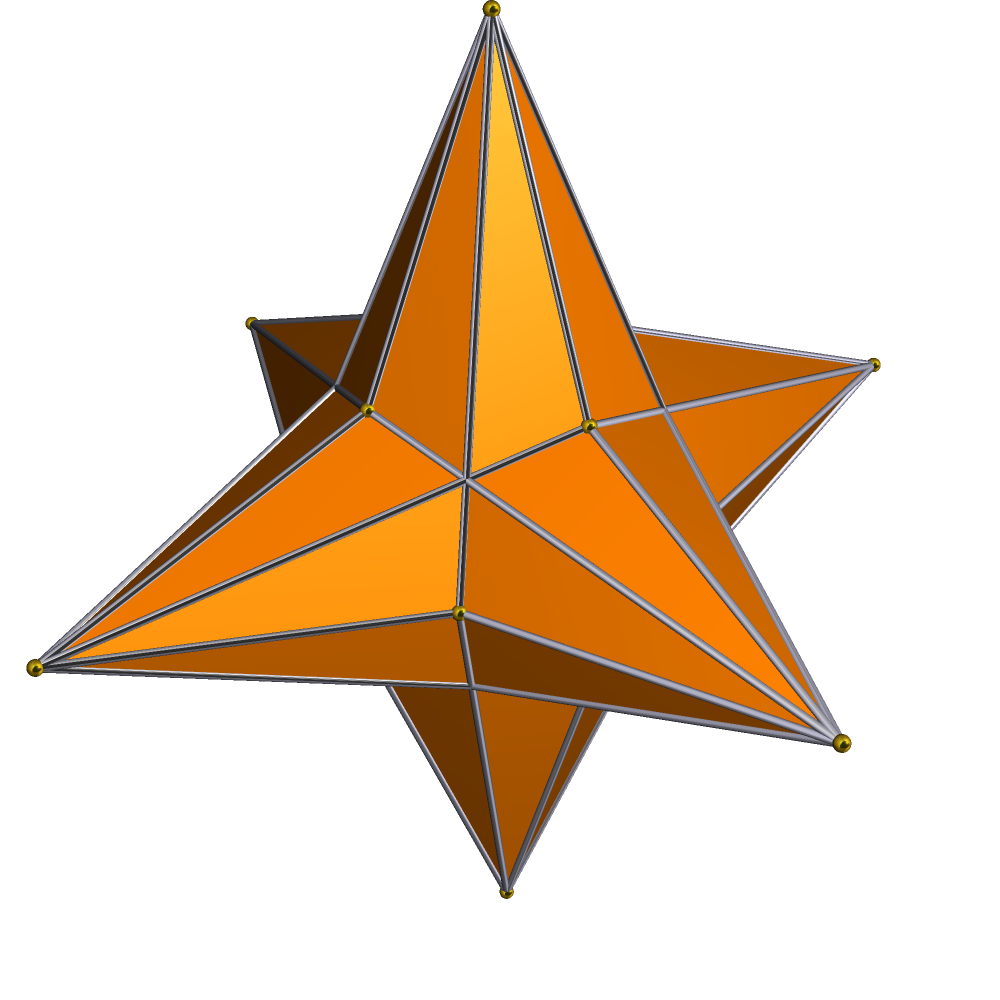
A small rhombihexacron, a polyhedron with antiparallelograms (formed by pairs of coplanar triangles) as its faces.

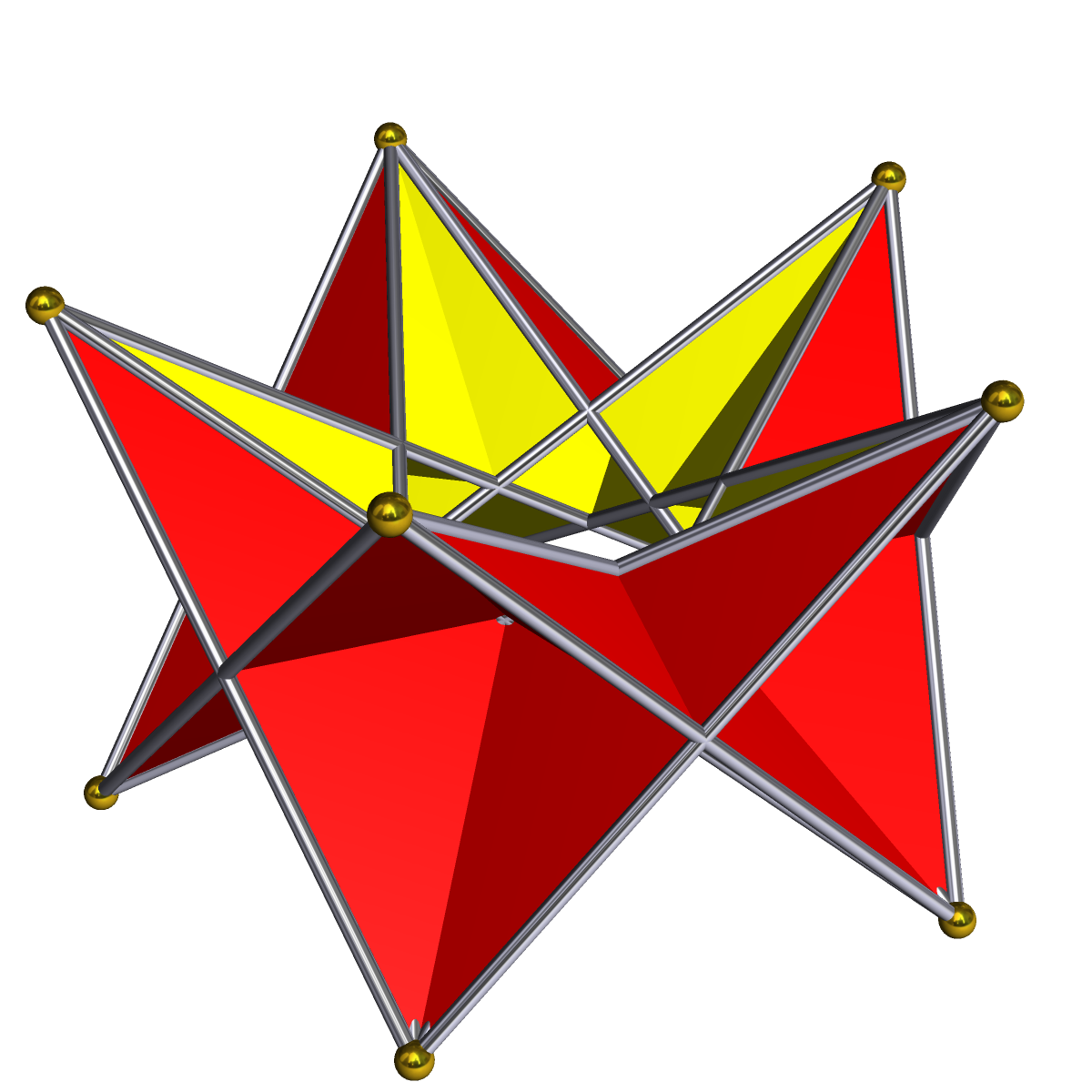
A stephanoid constructed from a pentagonal prism

A Bricard octahedron constructed as a bipyramid over an antiparallelogram.

Several nonconvex uniform polyhedra, including the tetrahemihexahedron, cubohemioctahedron, octahemioctahedron, small rhombihexahedron, small icosihemidodecahedron, and small dodecahemidodecahedron, have antiparallelograms as their vertex figures, the cross-sections formed by slicing the polyhedron by a plane that passes near a vertex, perpendicularly to the axis between the vertex and the center.

The faces of stephanoids, an infinite family of polyhedra that are both vertex- and face-transitive, are antiparallelograms. One form of a non-uniform but flexible polyhedron, the Bricard octahedron, can be constructed as a bipyramid over an antiparallelogram.

=== Four-bar linkages ===
Antiparallelogram linkage braced at its midpoints to stop it from uncrossing. Only three midpoint connections are required. Dotted links indicate the last link required for the fourth connection.

The antiparallelogram has been used as a form of four-bar linkage, in which four rigid beams of fixed length (the four sides of the antiparallelogram) may rotate with respect to each other at joints placed at the four vertices of the antiparallelogram. In this context it is also called a butterfly or bow-tie linkage. As a linkage, it has a point of instability in which it can be converted into a parallelogram and vice versa, but either of these linkages can be braced to prevent this instability.

For both the parallelogram and antiparallelogram linkages, if one of the long (crossed) edges of the linkage is fixed as a base, the free joints move on equal circles, but in a parallelogram they move in the same direction with equal velocities while in the antiparallelogram they move in opposite directions with unequal velocities. As James Watt discovered, if an antiparallelogram has its long side fixed in this way, the midpoint of the unfixed long edge will trace out a lemniscate or figure eight curve. For the antiparallelogram formed by the sides and diagonals of a square, it is the lemniscate of Bernoulli.

The antiparallelogram with its long side fixed is a variant of Watt's linkage. An antiparallelogram is an important feature in the design of Hart's inversor, a linkage that (like the Peaucellier–Lipkin linkage) can convert rotary motion to straight-line motion. An antiparallelogram-shaped linkage can also be used to connect the two axles of a four-wheeled vehicle, decreasing the turning radius of the vehicle relative to a suspension that only allows one axle to turn. A pair of nested antiparallelograms was used in a linkage defined by Alfred Kempe as part of Kempe's universality theorem, stating that any algebraic curve may be traced out by the joints of a suitably defined linkage. Kempe called the nested-antiparallelogram linkage a "multiplicator", as it could be used to multiply an angle by an integer. Used in the other direction, to divide angles, it can be used for angle trisection (although not as a straightedge and compass construction). Kempe's original constructions using this linkage overlooked the parallelogram-antiparallelogram instability, but bracing the linkages fixes his proof of the universality theorem.

=== Gear design ===
Fixing the short edge of an antiparallelogram linkage causes the crossing point to trace out an ellipse. These ellipses are the centrodes of the linkage.

Elliptical gears based on the motion of an antiparallelogram linkage

Suppose that one of the uncrossed edges of an antiparallelogram linkage is fixed in place, and the remaining linkage moves freely. As the linkage moves, each antiparallelogram formed can be divided into two congruent triangles meeting at the crossing point. In the triangle based on the fixed edge, the lengths of the two moving sides sum to the constant length of one of the antiparallelogram's crossed edges, and therefore the moving crossing point traces out an ellipse with the fixed points as its foci. Symmetrically, the second (moving) uncrossed edge of the antiparallelogram has as its endpoints the foci of a second ellipse, formed from the first one by reflection across a tangent line through the crossing point. Because the second ellipse rolls around the first, this construction of ellipses from the motion of an antiparallelogram can be used in the design of elliptical gears that convert uniform rotation into non-uniform rotation or vice versa.

=== Celestial mechanics ===
In the n-body problem, the study of the motions of point masses under Newton's law of universal gravitation, an important role is played by central configurations, solutions to the n-body problem in which all of the bodies rotate around some central point as if they were rigidly connected to each other. For instance, for three bodies, there are five solutions of this type, given by the five Lagrangian points. For four bodies, with two pairs of the bodies having equal masses (but with the ratio between the masses of the two pairs varying continuously), numerical evidence indicates that there exists a continuous family of central configurations, related to each other by the motion of an antiparallelogram linkage.
