= Isotoxal figure =

Polytope or tiling with one type of edge

In geometry, a polytope (for example, a polygon or a polyhedron) or a tiling is isotoxal (from Greek τόξον 'arc') or edge-transitive if its symmetries act transitively on its edges. Informally, this means that there is only one type of edge to the object: given two edges, there is a translation, rotation, and/or reflection that will move one edge to the other while leaving the region occupied by the object unchanged.

== Isotoxal polygons ==
An isotoxal polygon is an even-sided i.e. equilateral polygon, but not all equilateral polygons are isotoxal. The duals of isotoxal polygons are isogonal polygons. Isotoxal $4n$-gons are centrally symmetric, thus are also zonogons.

In general, a (non-regular) isotoxal $2n$-gon has $\mathrm{D}_n, (^*nn)$ dihedral symmetry. For example, a (non-square) rhombus is an isotoxal "$2$×$2$-gon" (quadrilateral) with $\mathrm{D}_2, (^*22)$ symmetry. All regular ${\color{royalblue}n}$-gons (also with odd $n$) are isotoxal, having double the minimum symmetry order: a regular $n$-gon has $\mathrm{D}_n, (^*nn)$ dihedral symmetry.

An isotoxal $\bold{2}n$-gon with outer internal angle $\alpha$ can be denoted by $\{n_\alpha\}.$ The inner internal angle $(\beta)$ may be less or greater than $180$${\color{royalblue}^\mathsf{o}},$ making convex or concave polygons respectively.

A star ${\color{royalblue}\bold{2}n}$-gon can also be isotoxal, denoted by $\{(n/q)_\alpha\},$ with $q \le n - 1$ and with the greatest common divisor $\gcd(n,q) = 1,$ where $q$ is the turning number or density. Concave inner vertices can be defined for $q < n/2.$ If $D = \gcd(n,q) \ge 2,$ then $\{(n/q)_\alpha\} = \{(Dm/Dp)_\alpha\}$ is "reduced" to a compound $D \{(m/p)_\alpha\}$ of $D$ rotated copies of $\{(m/p)_\alpha\}.$

Caution:

The vertices of $\{(n/q)_\alpha\}$ are not always placed like those of $\{n_\alpha\},$ whereas the vertices of the regular $\{n/q\}$ are placed like those of the regular $\{n\}.$

A set of "uniform" tilings, actually isogonal tilings using isotoxal polygons as less symmetric faces than regular ones, can be defined.

Examples of non-regular isotoxal polygons and compounds
Number of sides: $2n$	2×2 (Cent. sym.)	2×3	2×4 (Cent. sym.)	2×5	2×6 (Cent. sym.)	2×7	2×8 (Cent. sym.)
$\{n_\alpha\}$ Convex: $\beta < 180^\circ.$ Concave: $\beta > 180^\circ.$	$\{2_\alpha\}$	$\{3_\alpha\}$	$\{4_\alpha\}$	$\{5_\alpha\}$	$\{6_\alpha\}$	$\{7_\alpha\}$	$\{8_\alpha\}$
2-turn $\{(n/2)_\alpha\}$	--	$\{(3/2)_\alpha\}$	$2\{2_\alpha\}$	$\{(5/2)_\alpha\}$	$2\{3_\alpha\}$	$\{(7/2)_\alpha\}$	$2\{4_\alpha\}$
3-turn $\{(n/3)_\alpha\}$	--	--	$\{(4/3)_\alpha\}$	$\{(5/3)_\alpha\}$	$3\{2_\alpha\}$	$\{(7/3)_\alpha\}$	$\{(8/3)_\alpha\}$
4-turn $\{(n/4)_\alpha\}$	--	--	--	$\{(5/4)_\alpha\}$	$2\{(3/2)_\alpha\}$	$\{(7/4)_\alpha\}$	$4\{2_\alpha\}$
5-turn $\{(n/5)_\alpha\}$	--	--	--	--	$\{(6/5)_\alpha\}$	$\{(7/5)_\alpha\}$	$\{(8/5)_\alpha\}$
6-turn $\{(n/6)_\alpha\}$	--	--	--	--	--	$\{(7/6)_\alpha\}$	$2\{(4/3)_\alpha\}$
7-turn $\{(n/7)_\alpha\}$	--	--	--	--	--	--	$\{(8/7)_\alpha\}$

== Isotoxal polyhedra and tilings ==
Regular polyhedra are isohedral (face-transitive), isogonal (vertex-transitive), and isotoxal (edge-transitive).

Quasiregular polyhedra, like the cuboctahedron and the icosidodecahedron, are isogonal and isotoxal, but not isohedral. Their duals, including the rhombic dodecahedron and the rhombic triacontahedron, are isohedral and isotoxal, but not isogonal.

Examples
Quasiregular polyhedron	Quasiregular dual polyhedron	Quasiregular star polyhedron	Quasiregular dual star polyhedron	Quasiregular tiling	Quasiregular dual tiling
A cuboctahedron is an isogonal and isotoxal polyhedron	A rhombic dodecahedron is an isohedral and isotoxal polyhedron	A great icosidodecahedron is an isogonal and isotoxal star polyhedron	A great rhombic triacontahedron is an isohedral and isotoxal star polyhedron	The trihexagonal tiling is an isogonal and isotoxal tiling	The rhombille tiling is an isohedral and isotoxal tiling with p6m (*632) symmetry.

Not every polyhedron or 2-dimensional tessellation constructed from regular polygons is isotoxal. For instance, the truncated icosahedron (the familiar soccerball) is not isotoxal, as it has two edge types: hexagon-hexagon and hexagon-pentagon, and it is not possible for a symmetry of the solid to move a hexagon-hexagon edge onto a hexagon-pentagon edge.

An isotoxal polyhedron has the same dihedral angle for all edges.

The dual of a convex polyhedron is also a convex polyhedron.

The dual of a non-convex polyhedron is also a non-convex polyhedron. (By contraposition.)

The dual of an isotoxal polyhedron is also an isotoxal polyhedron. (See the Dual polyhedron article.)

There are nine convex isotoxal polyhedra: the five (regular) Platonic solids, the two (quasiregular) common cores of dual Platonic solids, and their two duals.

There are thirty-eight non-convex isotoxal polyhedra:

- the four regular Kepler-Poinsot polyhedra
- their two rectifications and their duals
- the three ditrigonary uniforms and their duals
- nine out of the ten uniform hemipolyhedra (all except the great dirhombicosidodecahedron)
- four isotoxal polyhedra constructed as the duals of dyadic interpretations of degenerate polyhedral compounds
- eleven isotoxal polyhedra which are neither isohedral nor isogonal

There are at least five isotoxal polyhedral compounds: the five regular polyhedral compounds; their five duals are also the five regular polyhedral compounds (or one chiral twin).

There are at least five isotoxal polygonal tilings of the Euclidean plane, and infinitely many isotoxal polygonal tilings of the hyperbolic plane, including the Wythoff constructions from the regular hyperbolic tilings {p,q}, and non-right (p q r) groups.

== See also ==
- Table of polyhedron dihedral angles
- Vertex-transitive
- Face-transitive
- Cell-transitive
