= Small dodecahemidodecacron =

Polyhedron with 30 faces

Small dodecahemidodecacron
Type	Star polyhedron
Face	—
Elements	F = 30, E = 60; V = 18 (χ = −12)
Symmetry group	I_{h}, [5,3], *532
Index references	DU_{51}
dual polyhedron	Small dodecahemidodecahedron

In geometry, the small dodecahemidodecacron is the dual of the small dodecahemidodecahedron, and is one of nine dual hemipolyhedra. It appears visually indistinct from the small icosihemidodecacron.

Since the hemipolyhedra have faces passing through the center, the dual figures have corresponding vertices at infinity; properly, on the real projective plane at infinity. In Magnus Wenninger's Dual Models, they are represented with intersecting prisms, each extending in both directions to the same vertex at infinity, in order to maintain symmetry. In practice the model prisms are cut off at a certain point that is convenient for the maker. Wenninger suggested these figures are members of a new class of stellation figures, called stellation to infinity. However, he also suggested that strictly speaking they are not polyhedra because their construction does not conform to the usual definitions.

The small dodecahemidodecahedron has six decagonal faces passing through the model center, the small dodecahemidodecacron can be seen as having six vertices at infinity.
