= German submarine U-62 =

U-62 may refer to one of the following German submarines:

- SM U-62, a Type U 57 submarine launched in 1916 and that served in the First World War until surrendered on 22 November 1918; broken up at Bo'ness in 1920–21
  - During the First World War, Germany also had these submarines with similar names:
    - SM UB-62, a Type UB III submarine launched in 1917 and surrendered on 21 November 1918; broken up at Swansea in 1922
    - SM UC-62, a Type UC II submarine launched in 1916 and sunk on 14 October 1917
- German submarine U-62 (1939), a Type IIC submarine that served in the Second World War until scuttled 2 May 1945
