= Great dodecahemicosahedron =

Polyhedron with 22 faces

Great dodecahemicosahedron
Type	Uniform star polyhedron
Elements	F = 22, E = 60; V = 30 (χ = −8)
Faces by sides	12{5}+10{6}
Coxeter diagram	(double covering)
Wythoff symbol	5/4 5 | 3 (double covering)
Symmetry group	I_{h}, [5,3], *532
Index references	U_{65}, C_{81}, W_{102}
Dual polyhedron	Great dodecahemicosacron
Vertex figure	5.6.5/4.6
Bowers acronym	Gidhei

3D model of a great dodecahemicosahedron

In geometry, the great dodecahemicosahedron (or small dodecahemiicosahedron) is a nonconvex uniform polyhedron, indexed as U_{65}. It has 22 faces (12 pentagons and 10 hexagons), 60 edges, and 30 vertices. Its vertex figure is a crossed quadrilateral.

It is a hemipolyhedron with ten hexagonal faces passing through the model center.

== Related polyhedra ==
Its convex hull is the icosidodecahedron. It also shares its edge arrangement with the dodecadodecahedron (having the pentagonal faces in common), and with the small dodecahemicosahedron (having the hexagonal faces in common).

Dodecadodecahedron	Small dodecahemicosahedron
Great dodecahemicosahedron	Icosidodecahedron (convex hull)

=== Great dodecahemicosacron ===
Great dodecahemicosacron
Type	Star polyhedron
Face	—
Elements	F = 30, E = 60; V = 22 (χ = −8)
Symmetry group	I_{h}, [5,3], *532
Index references	DU_{65}
dual polyhedron	Great dodecahemicosahedron

The great dodecahemicosacron is the dual of the great dodecahemicosahedron, and is one of nine dual hemipolyhedra. It appears visually indistinct from the small dodecahemicosacron.

Since the hemipolyhedra have faces passing through the center, the dual figures have corresponding vertices at infinity; properly, on the real projective plane at infinity. In Magnus Wenninger's Dual Models, they are represented with intersecting prisms, each extending in both directions to the same vertex at infinity, in order to maintain symmetry. In practice, the model prisms are cut off at a certain point that is convenient for the maker. Wenninger suggested these figures are members of a new class of stellation figures, called stellation to infinity. However, he also suggested that strictly speaking, they are not polyhedra because their construction does not conform to the usual definitions.

The great dodecahemicosahedron can be seen as having ten vertices at infinity.

== See also ==
- List of uniform polyhedra
- Hemi-icosahedron - The ten vertices at infinity correspond directionally to the 10 vertices of this abstract polyhedron.
