= Small nucleolar RNA SNORD62 =

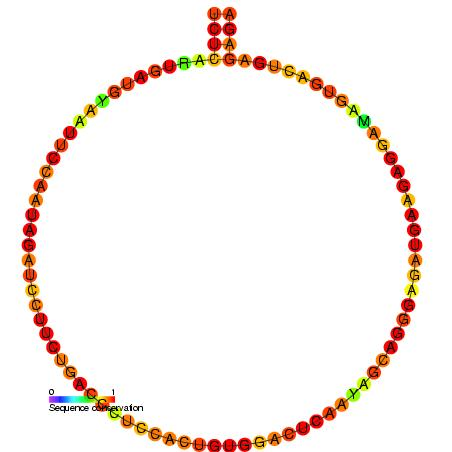
- Predicted secondary structure and sequence conservation of SNORD62

Identifiers
- Symbol: SNORD62
- Alt. Symbols: U62
- Rfam: RF00153

Other data
- RNA type: Gene; snRNA; snoRNA; C/D-box
- Domain: Eukaryota
- GO: GO:0006396 GO:0005730
- SO: SO:0000593
- PDB structures: PDBe

In molecular biology, snoRNA U62 (also known as SNORD62) is a non-coding RNA (ncRNA) molecule which functions in the modification of other small nuclear RNAs (snRNAs). This type of modifying RNA is usually located in the nucleolus of the eukaryotic cell which is a major site of snRNA biogenesis. It is known as a small nucleolar RNA (snoRNA) and also often referred to as a guide RNA.

snoRNA U62 belongs to the C/D box class of snoRNAs which contain the conserved sequence motifs known as the C box (UGAUGA) and the D box (CUGA). Most of the members of the box C/D family function in directing site-specific 2'-O-methylation of substrate RNAs.

In the human genome there are two identical copies of snoRNA U62 (called U62A and U62B) both of which are located within the introns of the same host gene which encodes a large protein named PRRC2B (KIAA0515). U62 is predicted to guide the 2'O-ribose methylation of 18S ribosomal RNA (rRNA) residue A590.
