= Hemipolyhedron =

Uniform star polyhedron whose faces pass through its center

In geometry, a hemipolyhedron is a uniform star polyhedron some of whose faces pass through its center. These hemi-faces lie parallel to the faces of some other symmetrical polyhedron, and their count is half the number of faces of that other polyhedron – hence the "hemi" prefix.

This prefix is also used to refer to certain projective polyhedra, such as the hemi-cube, which are the image of a 2 to 1 map of a spherical polyhedron with central symmetry.

== Wythoff symbols and vertex figures ==
=== Triangular domains ===
Hemipolyhedra are generally constructed using triangular spherical Schwarz triangles with three mirror planes; their Wythoff symbols are of the form ^{p}/_{(p − q)} ^{p}/_{q} | r, with vertex figures that are crossed quadrilaterals. They are thus related to the cantellated polyhedra, which have similar Wythoff symbols. The vertex configuration is ^{p}/_{q}.2r.^{p}/_{(p − q)}.2r. The 2r-gon faces pass through the center of the model: if represented as faces of spherical polyhedra, they cover an entire hemisphere and their edges and vertices lie along a great circle. The ^{p}/_{(p − q)} notation implies a {^{p}/_{q}} face turning backwards around the vertex figure.

The nine forms, listed with their Wythoff symbols and vertex configurations are:

Tetrahemihexahedron^{3}/_{2} 3 | 2 (3.4.^{3}/_{2}.4) (^{p}/_{q} = 3, r = 2)	Octahemioctahedron^{3}/_{2} 3 | 3 (3.6.^{3}/_{2}.6) (^{p}/_{q} = 3, r = 3)	Small icosihemidodecahedron^{3}/_{2} 3 | 5 (3.10.^{3}/_{2}.10) (^{p}/_{q} = 3, r = 5)	Great icosihemidodecahedron^{3}/_{2} 3 | ^{5}/_{3} (3.^{10}/_{3}.^{3}/_{2}.^{10}/_{3}) (^{p}/_{q} = 3, r = ^{5}/_{3})	Small dodecahemicosahedron^{5}/_{3} ^{5}/_{2} | 3 (^{5}/_{2}.6.^{5}/_{3}.6) (^{p}/_{q} = ^{5}/_{2}, r = 3)
	Cubohemioctahedron^{4}/_{3} 4 | 3 (4.6.^{4}/_{3}.6) (^{p}/_{q} = 4, r = 3)	Small dodecahemidodecahedron^{5}/_{4} 5 | 5 (5.10.^{5}/_{4}.10) (^{p}/_{q} = 5, r = 5)	Great dodecahemidodecahedron^{5}/_{3} ^{5}/_{2} | ^{5}/_{3} (^{5}/_{2}.^{10}/_{3}.^{5}/_{3}.^{10}/_{3}) (^{p}/_{q} = ^{5}/_{2}, r = ^{5}/_{3})	Great dodecahemicosahedron^{5}/_{4} 5 | 3 (5.6.^{5}/_{4}.6) (^{p}/_{q} = 5, r = 3)

Note that Wythoff's kaleidoscopic construction generates the nonorientable hemipolyhedra (all except the octahemioctahedron) as double covers (two coincident hemipolyhedra).

=== Quadrilateral domains ===
If the definition of a hemipolyhedron is relaxed to include any figure with sets of regular faces that pass through its center, then only two more hemipolyhedra are uniform (per Wenninger), the great dirhombicosidodecahedron and the great disnub dirhombidodecahedron. Though strictly non-Wythoffian in the conventional sense, a Wythoffian construction to the great dirhombicosidodecahedron can be generated with four mirror planes based on spherical quadrilaterals, through reflective symmetries found in the vertex figures of two enantiomorphic great snub dodecicosidodecahedra. The special Wythoff symbol associated with the great dirhombicosidodecahedron is, | ^{3}/_{2} ^{5}/_{3} 3 ^{5}/_{2}. Replacing the 40 non-snub triangles found in the great dirhombicosidodecahedron with snub triangles, produces a polyhedron with coincident edges and vertices, the great disnub dirhombidodecahedron, with Wythoff symbol | (^{3}/_{2}) ^{5}/_{3} (3) ^{5}/_{2}. The great disnub dirhombidodecahedron is the only hemipolyhedron to classify as a uniform degenerate polyhedron, since it contains some "double edges" where 4 faces meet. (Note: Uniform star polyhedra which are known to be degenerate yet are not hemipolyhedral exist, which include the small complex icosidodecahedron and the great complex icosidodecahedron.)

== Orientability ==
Only the octahemioctahedron represents an orientable surface; the remaining hemipolyhedra have non-orientable or single-sided surfaces. This is because proceeding around an equatorial 2r-gon, the ^{p}/_{q}-gonal faces alternately point "up" and "down", so any two consecutive ones have opposite senses. This is equivalent to demanding that the ^{p}/_{q}-gons in the corresponding quasiregular polyhedra below can be alternatively given positive and negative orientations. But that is only possible for the triangles of the cuboctahedron (corresponding to the triangles of the octahedron, the only regular polyhedron with an even number of faces meeting at a vertex), which are precisely the non-hemi faces of the octahemioctahedron.

== Duals of the hemipolyhedra ==
Since the hemipolyhedra have faces passing through the center, the dual figures have corresponding vertices at infinity; properly, on the real projective plane at infinity. In Magnus Wenninger's Dual Models, they are represented with intersecting prisms, each extending in both directions to the same vertex at infinity, in order to maintain symmetry. In practice the model prisms are cut off at a certain point that is convenient for the maker. Wenninger suggested these figures are members of a new class of stellation figures, called stellation to infinity. However, he also suggested that strictly speaking they are not polyhedra because their construction does not conform to the usual definitions.

There are 11 such duals (when including the great dirhombicosidodecacron dual to U_{75}, and the great disnub dirhombidodecahecron dual to U_{76}), sharing only 6 distinct outward forms, five of them existing in outwardly identical pairs. The members of a given visually identical pair differ in their arrangements of true and false vertices (a false vertex is where two edges cross each other but do not join). The outward forms are:

Image	Hemipolyhedron	Dual figure	Dual image	Stellation core
	Tetrahemihexahedron	Tetrahemihexacron		Cube
	Octahemioctahedron (cubohemioctahedron)	Octahemioctacron (hexahemioctacron)		Rhombic dodecahedron
	Small icosihemidodecahedron (small dodecahemidodecahedron)	Small icosihemidodecacron (small dodecahemidodecacron)		Rhombic triacontahedron
	Great dodecahemidodecahedron (great icosihemidodecahedron)	Great dodecahemidodecacron (great icosihemidodecacron)		Rhombic triacontahedron
	Great dodecahemicosahedron (small dodecahemicosahedron)	Great dodecahemicosacron (small dodecahemicosacron)		Rhombic triacontahedron
	Great dirhombicosidodecahedron (great disnub dirhombidodecahedron)	Great dirhombicosidodecacron (great disnub dirhombidodecacron)		Deltoidal hexecontahedron

The largest dual stellations to infinity (the great dirhombicosidodecacron and the great disnub dirhombidodecacron) coincide with each other as with the other stellations to infinity, even though their respective dual hemipolyhedra have distinct uniform properties (one of them is a degenerate uniform polyhedron).

== Relationships with various classes of polyhedra ==
=== Quasiregular polyhedra ===
The traditional hemipolyhedra based on spherical triangles occur in pairs as facetings of the quasiregular polyhedra with four faces at a vertex. These quasiregular polyhedra have vertex configuration m.n.m.n and their edges, in addition to forming the m- and n-gonal faces, also form hemi-faces in their corresponding hemipolyhedra. Thus, these hemipolyhedra can be derived from the quasiregular polyhedra by discarding either the m-gons or n-gons (to maintain two faces at an edge) and then inserting the hemi faces. Since either m-gons or n-gons may be discarded, either of two hemipolyhedra may be derived from each quasiregular polyhedron, except for the octahedron as a tetratetrahedron, where m = n = 3 and the two facetings are congruent. (This construction does not work for the quasiregular polyhedra with six faces at a vertex, also known as the ditrigonal polyhedra, as their edges do not form any regular hemi-faces.)

Since these hemipolyhedra, like the quasiregular polyhedra, also have two types of faces alternating around each vertex, they are sometimes also considered to be quasiregular.

Faceting m.n.m.n	Hemi-faces (h-gons)	Hemipolyhedron with m-gons discarded n.h.^{n}/_{n - 1}.h	Hemipolyhedron with n-gons discarded m.h.^{m}/_{m - 1}.h
Tetratetrahedron; 3.3.3.3 m = 3, n = 3	squares {4}	Tetrahemihexahedron; 3.4.3/2.4	Tetrahemihexahedron; 3.4.3/2.4
Cuboctahedron; 3.4.3.4 m = 3, n = 4	hexagons {6}	Cubohemioctahedron; 4.6.4/3.6	Octahemioctahedron; 3.6.3/2.6
Icosidodecahedron; 3.5.3.5 m = 3, n = 5	decagons {10}	Small dodecahemidodecahedron 5.10.5/4.10	Small icosihemidodecahedron 3.10.3/2.10
Dodecadodecahedron; 5.5/2.5.5/2 m = 5, n = 5/2	hexagons {6}	Small dodecahemicosahedron 5/2.6.5/3.6	Great dodecahemicosahedron 5.6.5/4.6
Great icosidodecahedron 3.5/2.3.5/2 m = 3, n = 5/2	decagrams {10/3}	Great dodecahemidodecahedron 5/2.10/3.5/3.10/3	Great icosihemidodecahedron 3.10/3.3/2.10/3

Here m and n correspond to ^{p}/_{q} above, and h corresponds to 2r above.

=== Other uniform star and compound polyhedra ===
The hemipolyhedra showing symmetry about quadrialteral spherical domains—i.e., the great dirhombicosidodecahedron and the great disnub dirhombidodecahedron—do not have a quasiregular polyhedron that facets them, as with the traditional hemipolyhedra constructed using triangular spherical domains. However, they have the same vertex-arrangement that belongs to three other uniform polyhedra: the great snub dodecicosidodecahedron, compound of twenty octahedra, and the compound of twenty tetrahemihexahedra. As hemipolyhedra, both the great dirhombicosidodecahedron and the great disnub dirhombidodecahedron have hemi-faces as with the traditional hemipolyhedra of the form ^{p}/_{(p − q)} ^{p}/_{q} | r, though they are not shared by the faceting star and compound polyhedra aforementioned; in both of these special cases, the hemi-faces that pass through their centers form 60 irregular octagrams from pairs of snub squares.

Convex hull	Facetings	Hemipolyhedron (viz. quadrilateral domains)	Hemi-face (h-gon)
Rhombicosidodecahedron (nonuniform)	Compound of twenty octahedra 3.3.4.4.3.3.4.4 Great snub dodecicosidodecahedron 3.3.3.5/2.3.5/3 Compound of twenty tetrahemihexahedra 3.4.3/2.4	Great dirhombicosidodecahedron 4.5/3.4.3.4.5/2.4.3/2	Snub double squares (irregular octagrams)
Rhombicosidodecahedron (nonuniform)	Compound of twenty octahedra 3.3.4.4.3.3.4.4 Great snub dodecicosidodecahedron 3.3.3.5/2.3.5/3 Compound of twenty tetrahemihexahedra 3.4.3/2.4	Great disnub dirhombidodecahedron (degenerate); 5/2.4.3.3.3.4.5/3.4.3.3/2.3/2.4/2	Snub double squares (irregular octagrams)
