= Cubohemioctahedron =

Polyhedron with 10 faces

Cubohemioctahedron
Type	Uniform star polyhedron
Elements	F = 10, E = 24; V = 12 (χ = −2)
Faces by sides	6{4}+4{6}
Coxeter diagram	(double-covering)
Wythoff symbol	4/3 4 | 3 (double-covering)
Symmetry group	O_{h}, [4,3], *432
Index references	U_{15}, C_{51}, W_{78}
Dual polyhedron	Hexahemioctacron
Vertex figure	4.6.4/3.6
Bowers acronym	Cho

3D model of a cubohemioctahedron

In geometry, the cubohemioctahedron is a nonconvex uniform polyhedron, indexed as U_{15}. It has 10 faces (6 squares and 4 regular hexagons), 24 edges and 12 vertices. Its vertex figure is a crossed quadrilateral.

It is given Wythoff symbol 4/3 4 | 3, although that is a double-covering of this figure.

A nonconvex polyhedron has intersecting faces which do not represent new edges or faces. In the picture vertices are marked by golden spheres, and edges by silver cylinders.

It is a hemipolyhedron with 4 hexagonal faces passing through the model center. The hexagons intersect each other and so only triangular portions of each are visible.

== Related polyhedra ==
It shares the vertex arrangement and edge arrangement with the cuboctahedron (having the square faces in common), and with the octahemioctahedron (having the hexagonal faces in common).

Cuboctahedron	Cubohemioctahedron	Octahemioctahedron

=== Tetrahexagonal tiling ===
The cubohemioctahedron can be seen as a net on the hyperbolic tetrahexagonal tiling with vertex figure 4.6.4.6.

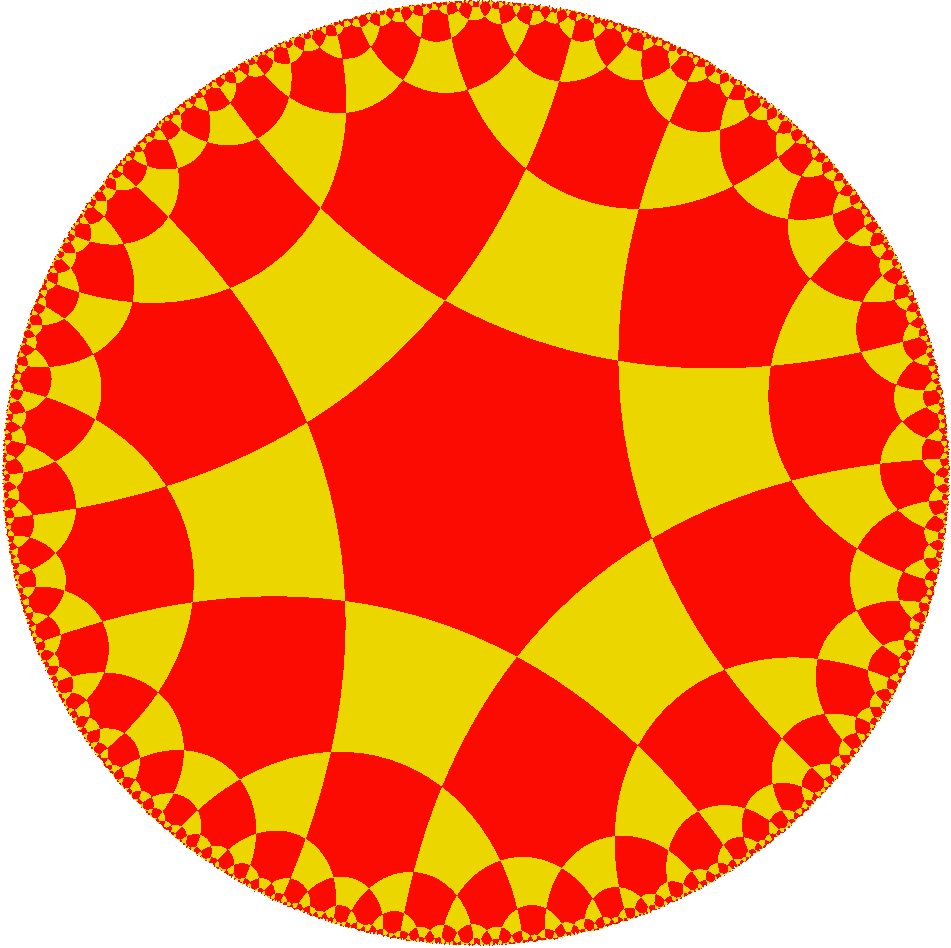

=== Hexahemioctacron ===
Hexahemioctacron
Type	Star polyhedron
Face	—
Elements	F = 12, E = 24; V = 10 (χ = −2)
Symmetry group	O_{h}, [4,3], *432
Index references	DU_{15}
dual polyhedron	Cubohemioctahedron

The hexahemioctacron is the dual of the cubohemioctahedron, and is one of nine dual hemipolyhedra. It appears visually indistinct from the octahemioctacron.

Since the cubohemioctahedron has four hexagonal faces passing through the model center, thus it is degenerate, and can be seen as having four vertices at infinity.

In Magnus Wenninger's Dual Models, they are represented with intersecting infinite prisms passing through the model center, cut off at a certain point that is convenient for the maker.

== See also ==
- Hemi-cube - The four vertices at infinity correspond directionally to the four vertices of this abstract polyhedron.
