= Small dodecahemicosahedron =

Polyhedron with 22 faces

Small dodecahemicosahedron
Type	Uniform star polyhedron
Elements	F = 22, E = 60; V = 30 (χ = −8)
Faces by sides	12{5/2}+10{6}
Coxeter diagram	
Wythoff symbol	5/3 5/2 | 3 (double covering)
Symmetry group	I_{h}, [5,3], *532
Index references	U_{62}, C_{78}, W_{100}
Dual polyhedron	Small dodecahemicosacron
Vertex figure	6.5/2.6.5/3
Bowers acronym	Sidhei

3D model of a small dodecahemicosahedron

In geometry, the small dodecahemicosahedron (or great dodecahemiicosahedron) is a nonconvex uniform polyhedron, indexed as U_{62}. It has 22 faces (12 pentagrams and 10 hexagons), 60 edges, and 30 vertices. Its vertex figure is a crossed quadrilateral.

It is a hemipolyhedron with ten hexagonal faces passing through the model center.

== Related polyhedra ==
Its convex hull is the icosidodecahedron. It also shares its edge arrangement with the dodecadodecahedron (having the pentagrammic faces in common), and with the great dodecahemicosahedron (having the hexagonal faces in common).

Dodecadodecahedron	Small dodecahemicosahedron
Great dodecahemicosahedron	Icosidodecahedron (convex hull)

== Gallery ==
Traditional filling	Modulo-2 filling

== See also ==
- List of uniform polyhedra
