= Small dodecahemidodecahedron =

Uniform star polyhedron with 18 faces

Small dodecahemidodecahedron
Type	Uniform star polyhedron
Elements	F = 18, E = 60; V = 30 (χ = −12)
Faces by sides	12{5}+6{10}
Coxeter diagram	(double covering)
Wythoff symbol	5/4 5 | 5 (double covering)
Symmetry group	I_{h}, [5,3], *532
Index references	U_{51}, C_{65}, W_{91}
Dual polyhedron	Small dodecahemidodecacron
Vertex figure	5.10.5/4.10
Bowers acronym	Sidhid

3D model of a small dodecahemidodecahedron

In geometry, the small dodecahemidodecahedron is a nonconvex uniform polyhedron, indexed as U_{51}. It has 18 faces (12 pentagons and 6 decagons), 60 edges, and 30 vertices. Its vertex figure alternates two regular pentagons and decagons as a crossed quadrilateral.

It is a hemipolyhedron with six decagonal faces passing through the model center.

== Related polyhedra ==
It shares its edge arrangement with the icosidodecahedron (its convex hull, having the pentagonal faces in common), and with the small icosihemidodecahedron (having the decagonal faces in common).

Icosidodecahedron	Small icosihemidodecahedron	Small dodecahemidodecahedron
