= Small icosihemidodecahedron =

Uniform star polyhedron with 26 faces

Small icosihemidodecahedron
Type	Uniform star polyhedron
Elements	F = 26, E = 60; V = 30 (χ = −4)
Faces by sides	20{3}+6{10}
Coxeter diagram	(double covering)
Wythoff symbol	3/2 3 | 5 (double covering)
Symmetry group	I_{h}, [5,3], *532
Index references	U_{49}, C_{63}, W_{89}
Dual polyhedron	Small icosihemidodecacron
Vertex figure	3.10.3/2.10
Bowers acronym	Seihid

3D model of a small icosihemidodecahedron

In geometry, the small icosihemidodecahedron (or small icosahemidodecahedron) is a uniform star polyhedron, indexed as U_{49}. It has 26 faces (20 triangles and 6 decagons), 60 edges, and 30 vertices. Its vertex figure alternates two regular triangles and decagons as a crossed quadrilateral. It is a hemipolyhedron with its six decagonal faces passing through the model center.

It is given a Wythoff symbol, 3/2 3 | 5, but that construction represents a double covering of this model.

== Related polyhedra ==
It shares its edge arrangement with the icosidodecahedron (its convex hull, having the triangular faces in common), and with the small dodecahemidodecahedron (having the decagonal faces in common).

Icosidodecahedron	Small icosihemidodecahedron	Small dodecahemidodecahedron

== See also ==
- Pentakis icosidodecahedron
- List of uniform polyhedra
