= Magnus Wenninger =

American mathematician (1919–2017)

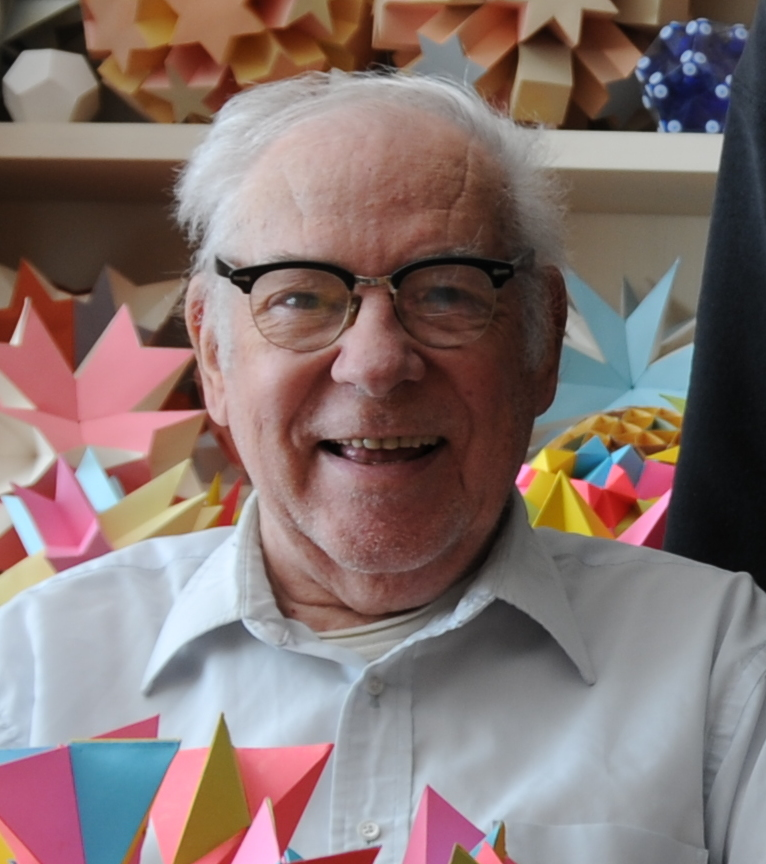
Magnus Wenninger in 2009 in his office

Father Magnus J. Wenninger OSB (October 31, 1919– February 17, 2017) was an American mathematician who worked on constructing polyhedron models, and wrote the first book on their construction.

== Early life and education ==
Born to German immigrants in Park Falls, Wisconsin, Joseph Wenninger always knew he was going to be a priest. From an early age, it was understood that his brother Heinie would take after their father and become a baker, and that Joe, as he was then known, would go into the priesthood.

When Wenninger was thirteen, after graduating from the parochial school in Park Falls, Wisconsin, his parents saw an advertisement in the German newspaper Der Wanderer that would help to shape the rest of his life. The ad was for a preparatory school in Collegeville, Minnesota, associated with the Benedictine St. John's University.

While admitting to feeling homesick at first, Wenninger quickly made friends and, after a year, knew that this was where he needed to be. He was a student in a section of the prep school that functioned as a "minor seminary" – later moving on into St. John's where he studied philosophy and theology, which led into the priesthood.

== Career ==
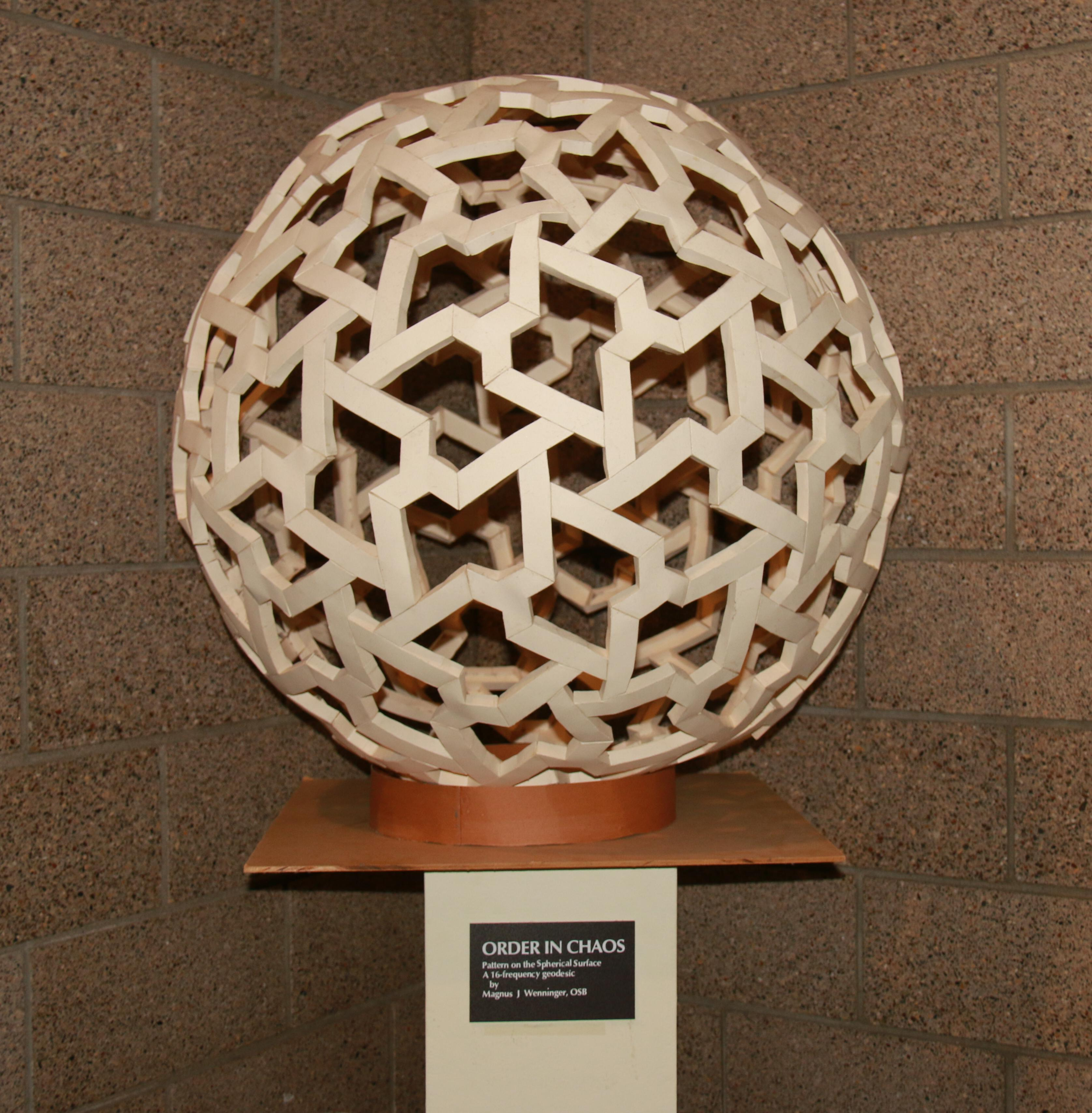
An artistic model created by Father Wenninger called Order in Chaos, representing a chiral subset of triangles of a 16-frequency icosahedral geodesic sphere

When Fr. Wenninger became a Benedictine monk, he took on his monastic name Magnus, meaning "Great". At the start of his career, Wenninger did not set out on a path one might expect would lead to his becoming the great polyhedronist that he is known as today. Rather, a few chance happenings and seemingly minor decisions shaped a course for Wenninger that led to his groundbreaking studies.

Shortly after becoming a priest, Wenninger's Abbot informed him that their order was starting up a school in the Bahamas. It was decided that Wenninger would be assigned to teach at that school. In order to do this, it was necessary that he get a master's degree. Wenninger was sent to the University of Ottawa, in Canada, to study educational psychology. There he studied symbolic logic under Thomas Greenwood of the philosophy department. His thesis title was "The Concept of Number According to Roger Bacon and Albert the Great".

After completing his degree, Wenninger went to the school in the Bahamas, where he was asked by the headmaster to choose between teaching English or math. Wenninger chose math, since it seemed to be more in line with the topic of his MA thesis. However, not having taken many math courses in college, Wenninger admits to being able to teach by staying a few pages ahead of the students. He taught Algebra, Euclidean Geometry, Trigonometry and Analytic Geometry.

After ten years of teaching, Wenninger felt he was becoming a bit stale. At the suggestion of his headmaster, Wenninger attended the Columbia Teachers College in summer sessions over a four-year period in the late fifties. It was here that his interest in the "New Math" was formed and his studies of the polyhedra began.

Wenninger died at the age of 97, at St John's Abbey on Friday, February 17, 2017.

== Publications ==
Wenninger's first publication on the topic of polyhedra was the booklet entitled, "Polyhedron Models for the Classroom", which he wrote in 1966. He wrote to H. S. M. Coxeter and received a copy of Uniform polyhedra which had a complete list of all 75 uniform polyhedra. After this, he spent a great deal of time building various polyhedra. He made 65 of them and had them on display in his classroom. At this point, Wenninger decided to contact a publisher to see if there was any interest in a book. He had the models photographed and wrote the accompanying text, which he sent off to Cambridge University Press in London. The publishers indicated an interest in the book only if Wenninger built all 75 of the uniform polyhedra.

Wenninger did complete the models, with the help of R. Buckley of Oxford University who had done the calculations for the ten snub forms by computer. This allowed Wenninger to build these difficult polyhedra with the exact measurements for lengths of the edges and shapes of the faces. This was the first time that all of the uniform polyhedra had been made as paper models. This project took Wenninger nearly ten years, and the book, Polyhedron Models, was published by the Cambridge University Press in 1971, largely due to the exceptional photographs taken locally in Nassau.

From 1971 onward, Wenninger focused his attention on the projection of the uniform polyhedra onto the surface of their circumscribing spheres. This led to the publication of his second book, Spherical Models in 1979, showing how regular and semiregular polyhedra can be used to build geodesic domes. He also exchanged ideas with other mathematicians, Hugo Verheyen and Gilbert Fleurent.

In 1981, Wenninger left the Bahamas and returned to St. John's Abbey. His third book, Dual Models, appeared in 1983. The book is a sequel to Polyhedron Models, since it includes instructions on how to make paper models of the duals of all 75 uniform polyhedra.

== See also ==
- List of Wenninger polyhedron models

== issue 02 ==
- Banchoff, Thomas, Father Magnus and his polyhedrons (PDF), LAB Issue 02, June 2008
- Friedman, Nat. (2007), "Magnus Wenninger: Mathematical Models" (PDF), Hyperseeing, archived from the original (PDF) on 2019-08-01

== Publications ==
- Wenninger, Magnus (1971), Polyhedron Models, Cambridge University Press, ISBN 978-0-521-09859-5, MR 0467493
- Wenninger, Magnus (1979), Spherical Models, Cambridge University Press, ISBN 978-0-521-29432-4, MR 0552023, archived from the original on July 4, 2008 Reprinted by Dover 1999 ISBN 978-0-486-40921-4
- Wenninger, Magnus (1983), Dual Models, Cambridge University Press, doi:10.1017/CBO9780511569371, ISBN 978-0-521-54325-5, MR 0730208

Complete publications, arranged chronologically:

- 1963-69
  - Stellated Rhombic Dodecahedron Puzzle The Mathematics Teacher (March 1963).
  - The World of Polyhedrons The Mathematics Teacher (March 1965).
  - Some Facts About Uniform Polyhedrons. Summation: Association of Teachers of Mathematics of New York City. 11:6 (June 1966) 33–35.
  - Fancy Shapes from Geometric Figures. Grade Teacher 84:4 (December 1966) 61–63, 129–130.
- 1970-79
  - Polyhedron Models for the Classroom National Council of Teachers of Mathematics, 1966, 2nd Edition, 1975. Spanish language edition: Olsina, Spain, 1975.
  - Some Interesting Octahedral Compounds The Mathematics Gazette (February 1968).
  - A New Look for the Old Platonic Solids Summation: Journal of the Association of Teachers of Mathematics (Winter 1971).
  - Polyhedron Models Cambridge University Press, London and New York. 1971. Paperback Edition, 1974. Reprinted 1975, 1976, 1978, 1979, 1981, 1984, 1985, 1987, 1989, 1990. Russian language edition: Mir, Moscow, 1974; Japanese language edition: Dainippon, Tokyo, 1979.
  - The Story of Polyhedron Models. American Benedictine Review (June 1972).
  - News from the World of Polyhedrons. Summation (Association of Teachers of Mathematics of New York City) 20:2 (Winter 1975) 3–5.
  - A Compound of Five Dodecahedra The Mathematical Gazette. LX (1976).
  - Geodesic Domes by Euclidean Construction. The Mathematics Teacher (October 1978).
  - Spherical Models Cambridge University Press, London and New York (1979); paperback edition, 1979.
  - Fuller figure (Reader Reflections). Mathematics Teacher 72 (March 1979) 164.
- 1980-89
  - Avenues for Polyhedronal Research Structural Topology, No. 5 (1980).
  - Dual Models Cambridge University Press, London and New York, 1983.
  - Polyhedron Posters Palo Alto: Dale Seymour Publications, 1983.
  - Senechal, M. and G. Fleck, eds. The Great Stellated Dodecahedron. Part 2. Section C. Shaping Space. Boston: Birkhauser, 1988.
  - Messer, P., jt. author. Symmetry and Polyhedronal Stellation. II. Computers and Mathematics with Applications (Pergamon Press) 17:1-3 (1989).
- 1990-99
  - Polyhedrons and the Golden Number Symmetry 1:1 (1990).
  - Artistic Tessellation Patterns on the Spherical Surface International Journal of Space Structures (Multi-Science Publ.) 5:3-4 (1990).
  - Tarnai, T., jt.-author. Spherical Circle-Coverings and Geodesic Domes Structural Topology, No. 16 (1990).
  - Messer, P., jt.-author. Patterns on the Spherical Surface International Journal of Space Structures 11:1 & 2 (1996).
  - Spherical Models Dover Publications, New York (1999). Republication of the work published by Cambridge University Press, Cambridge, England, 1979. New Appendix. Paperbound.
- 2000-
  - Symmetrical Patterns on a Sphere, essay #5 in Part I, of a two-part work, Symmetry 2000, containing 52 essays. Edited by Istvan Hargittai and Torvard C. Laurent, Wenner-Gren International Series, Volume 80, London: Portland Press (2002), pp. 41-51.
  - Memoirs of a Polyhedronist, Symmetry: Culture and Science, 11:1-4 (2000) 7-15. The Quarterly of the International Society for the Interdisciplinary Study of Symmetry (ISIS-Symmetry).
