= Heptagrammic-order heptagonal tiling =

Heptagrammic-order heptagonal tiling
Poincaré disk model of the hyperbolic plane
Type	Hyperbolic regular tiling
Vertex configuration	7^{7/2}
Schläfli symbol	{7,7/2}
Wythoff symbol	7/2 | 7 2
Coxeter diagram	
Symmetry group	[7,3], (*732)
Dual	Order-7 heptagrammic tiling
Properties	Vertex-transitive, edge-transitive, face-transitive

In geometry, the heptagrammic-order heptagonal tiling is a regular star-tiling of the hyperbolic plane. It has Schläfli symbol of {7,7/2}. The vertex figure heptagrams are {7/2},. The heptagonal faces overlap with density 3.

== Related tilings ==
It has the same vertex arrangement as the regular order-7 triangular tiling, {3,7}. The full set of edges coincide with the edges of a heptakis heptagonal tiling.

It is related to a Kepler-Poinsot polyhedron, the great dodecahedron, {5,5/2}, which is polyhedron and a density-3 regular star-tiling on the sphere (resembling a regular icosahedron in this state, similarly to this tessellation resembling the order-7 triangular tiling):
