= Truncated heptagonal tiling =

Semiregular tiling of the hyperbolic plane

Truncated heptagonal tiling
Poincaré disk model of the hyperbolic plane
Type	Hyperbolic uniform tiling
Vertex configuration	3.14.14
Schläfli symbol	t{7,3}
Wythoff symbol	2 3 | 7
Coxeter diagram	
Symmetry group	[7,3], (*732)
Dual	Order-7 triakis triangular tiling
Properties	Vertex-transitive

In geometry, the truncated heptagonal tiling is a semiregular tiling of the hyperbolic plane. There are one triangle and two tetradecagons on each vertex. It has Schläfli symbol of t{7,3}. The tiling has a vertex configuration of 3.14.14.

== Dual tiling ==
The dual tiling is called an order-7 triakis triangular tiling, seen as an order-7 triangular tiling with each triangle divided into three by a center point.

== Related polyhedra and tilings ==
This hyperbolic tiling is topologically related as a part of sequence of uniform truncated polyhedra with vertex configurations (3.2n.2n), and [n,3] Coxeter group symmetry.

*n32 symmetry mutation of truncated tilings: t{n,3}
Symmetry *n32 [n,3]	Spherical				Euclid.	Compact hyperb.		Paraco.	Noncompact hyperbolic		
Symmetry *n32 [n,3]	*232 [2,3]	*332 [3,3]	*432 [4,3]	*532 [5,3]	*632 [6,3]	*732 [7,3]	*832 [8,3]...	*∞32 [∞,3]	[12i,3]	[9i,3]	[6i,3]
Truncated figures											
Symbol	t{2,3}	t{3,3}	t{4,3}	t{5,3}	t{6,3}	t{7,3}	t{8,3}	t{∞,3}	t{12i,3}	t{9i,3}	t{6i,3}
Triakis figures											
Config.	V3.4.4	V3.6.6	V3.8.8	V3.10.10	V3.12.12	V3.14.14	V3.16.16	V3.∞.∞			

From a Wythoff construction there are eight hyperbolic uniform tilings that can be based from the regular heptagonal tiling.

Drawing the tiles colored as red on the original faces, yellow at the original vertices, and blue along the original edges, there are eight forms.

Uniform heptagonal/triangular tilings
Symmetry: [7,3], (*732)							[7,3]^{+}, (732)
{7,3}	t{7,3}	r{7,3}	t{3,7}	{3,7}	rr{7,3}	tr{7,3}	sr{7,3}
Uniform duals
V7^{3}	V3.14.14	V3.7.3.7	V6.6.7	V3^{7}	V3.4.7.4	V4.6.14	V3.3.3.3.7

== See also ==
- Truncated hexagonal tiling
- Heptagonal tiling
- Tilings of regular polygons
- List of uniform tilings
