= Snub triheptagonal tiling =

Semiregular tiling of the hyperbolic plane

Snub triheptagonal tiling
Poincaré disk model of the hyperbolic plane
Type	Hyperbolic uniform tiling
Vertex configuration	3.3.3.3.7
Schläfli symbol	sr{7,3} or $s\begin{Bmatrix} 7 \\ 3 \end{Bmatrix}$
Wythoff symbol	| 7 3 2
Coxeter diagram	or
Symmetry group	[7,3]^{+}, (732)
Dual	Order-7-3 floret pentagonal tiling
Properties	Vertex-transitive Chiral

In geometry, the order-3 snub heptagonal tiling is a semiregular tiling of the hyperbolic plane. There are four triangles and one heptagon on each vertex. It has Schläfli symbol of sr{7,3}. The snub tetraheptagonal tiling is another related hyperbolic tiling with Schläfli symbol sr{7,4}.

== Images ==
Drawn in chiral pairs, with edges missing between black triangles:

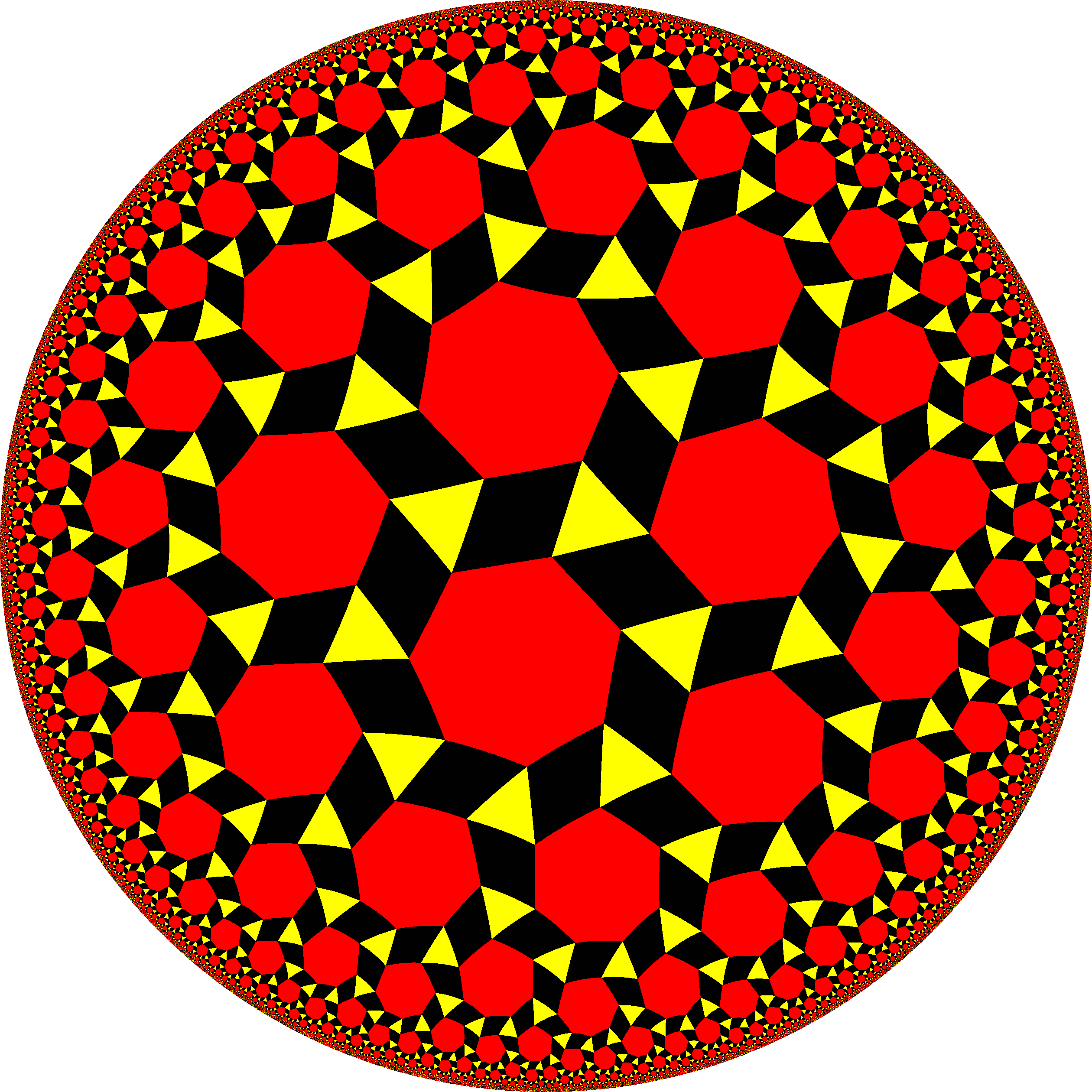
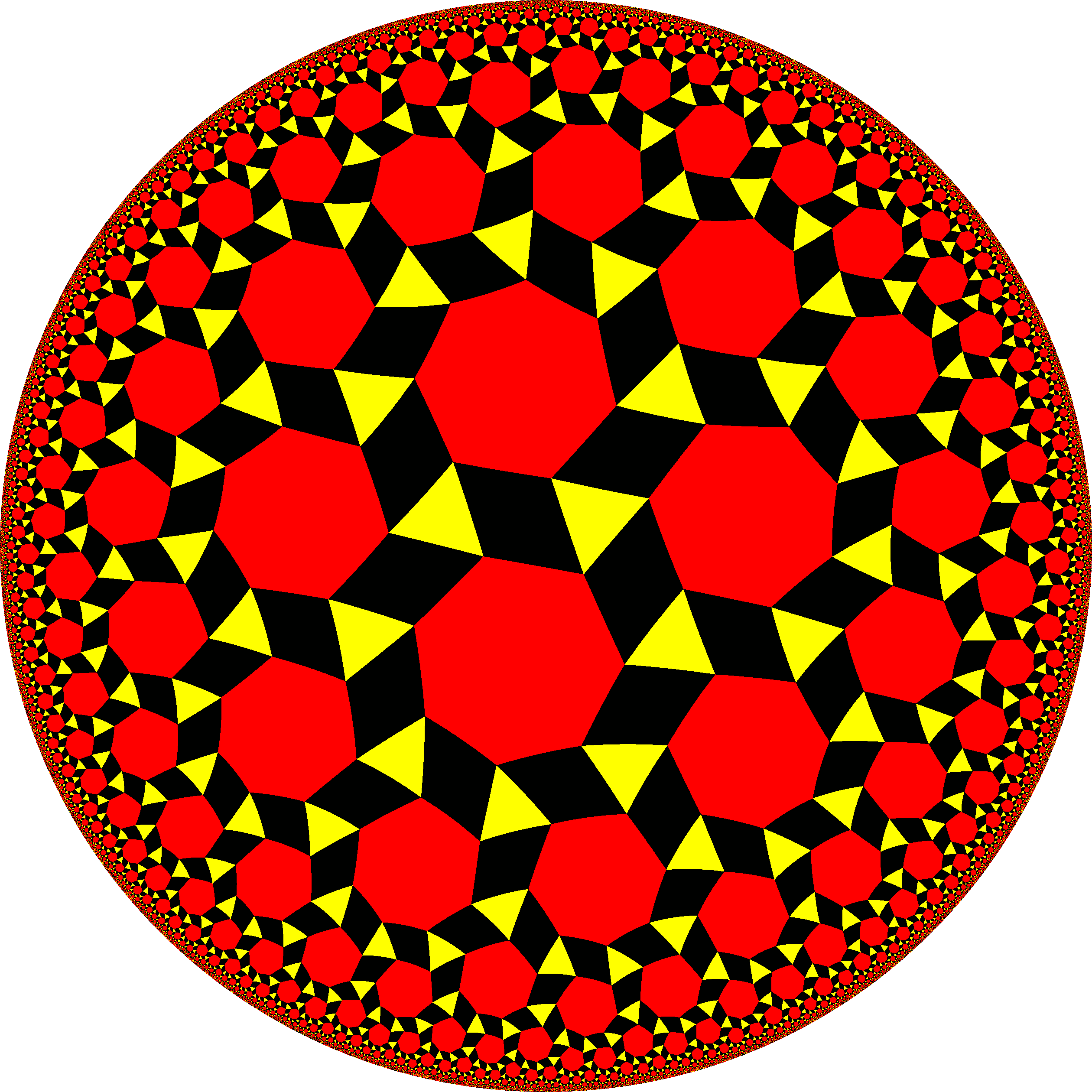

== Dual tiling ==
The dual tiling is called an order-7-3 floret pentagonal tiling, and is related to the floret pentagonal tiling.

== Related polyhedra and tilings ==
This semiregular tiling is a member of a sequence of snubbed polyhedra and tilings with vertex figure (3.3.3.3.n) and Coxeter–Dynkin diagram. These figures and their duals have (n32) rotational symmetry, being in the Euclidean plane for n=6, and hyperbolic plane for any higher n. The series can be considered to begin with n=2, with one set of faces degenerated into digons.

n32 symmetry mutations of snub tilings: 3.3.3.3.n
Symmetry n32	Spherical				Euclidean	Compact hyperbolic		Paracomp.
Symmetry n32	232	332	432	532	632	732	832	∞32
Snub figures								
Config.	3.3.3.3.2	3.3.3.3.3	3.3.3.3.4	3.3.3.3.5	3.3.3.3.6	3.3.3.3.7	3.3.3.3.8	3.3.3.3.∞
Gyro figures								
Config.	V3.3.3.3.2	V3.3.3.3.3	V3.3.3.3.4	V3.3.3.3.5	V3.3.3.3.6	V3.3.3.3.7	V3.3.3.3.8	V3.3.3.3.∞

From a Wythoff construction there are eight hyperbolic uniform tilings that can be based from the regular heptagonal tiling.

Drawing the tiles colored as red on the original faces, yellow at the original vertices, and blue along the original edges, there are 8 forms.

Uniform heptagonal/triangular tilings
Symmetry: [7,3], (*732)							[7,3]^{+}, (732)
{7,3}	t{7,3}	r{7,3}	t{3,7}	{3,7}	rr{7,3}	tr{7,3}	sr{7,3}
Uniform duals
V7^{3}	V3.14.14	V3.7.3.7	V6.6.7	V3^{7}	V3.4.7.4	V4.6.14	V3.3.3.3.7

== See also ==
- Snub hexagonal tiling
  - Floret pentagonal tiling
- Order-3 heptagonal tiling
- Tilings of regular polygons
- List of uniform planar tilings
- Kagome lattice
