= Rhombitriheptagonal tiling =

Geometric tiling

Rhombitriheptagonal tiling
Poincaré disk model of the hyperbolic plane
| Type | Hyperbolic uniform tiling |
| Vertex configuration | 3.4.7.4 |
| Schläfli symbol | rr{7,3} or $r\begin{Bmatrix} 7 \\ 3 \end{Bmatrix}$ |
| Wythoff symbol | 3 | 7 2 |
| Coxeter diagram | or |
| Symmetry group | [7,3], (*732) |
| Dual | Deltoidal triheptagonal tiling |
| Properties | Vertex-transitive |

In geometry, the rhombitriheptagonal tiling is a semiregular tiling of the hyperbolic plane. At each vertex of the tiling there is one triangle and one heptagon, alternating between two squares. The tiling has Schläfli symbol rr{7, 3}. It can be seen as constructed as a rectified triheptagonal tiling, r{7,3}, as well as an expanded heptagonal tiling or expanded order-7 triangular tiling.

== Dual tiling ==
The dual tiling is called a deltoidal triheptagonal tiling, and consists of congruent kites. It is formed by overlaying an order-3 heptagonal tiling and an order-7 triangular tiling.

== Related polyhedra and tilings ==
From a Wythoff construction there are eight hyperbolic uniform tilings that can be based from the regular heptagonal tiling.

Drawing the tiles colored as red on the original faces, yellow at the original vertices, and blue along the original edges, there are 8 forms.

Uniform heptagonal/triangular tilings
| Symmetry: [7,3], (*732) | | | | | | | [7,3]^{+}, (732) |
| {7,3} | t{7,3} | r{7,3} | t{3,7} | {3,7} | rr{7,3} | tr{7,3} | sr{7,3} |
Uniform duals
| V7^{3} | V3.14.14 | V3.7.3.7 | V6.6.7 | V3^{7} | V3.4.7.4 | V4.6.14 | V3.3.3.3.7 |

=== Symmetry mutations ===
This tiling is topologically related as a part of sequence of cantellated polyhedra with vertex figure (3.4.n.4), and continues as tilings of the hyperbolic plane. These vertex-transitive figures have (*n32) reflectional symmetry.

*n32 symmetry mutation of dual expanded tilings: V3.4.n.4
| Symmetry *n32 [n,3] | Spherical | | | | Euclid. | Compact hyperb. | | Paraco. |
| Symmetry *n32 [n,3] | *232 [2,3] | *332 [3,3] | *432 [4,3] | *532 [5,3] | *632 [6,3] | *732 [7,3] | *832 [8,3]... | *∞32 [∞,3] |
|---|---|---|---|---|---|---|---|---|
| Figure Config. | V3.4.2.4 | V3.4.3.4 | V3.4.4.4 | V3.4.5.4 | V3.4.6.4 | V3.4.7.4 | V3.4.8.4 | V3.4.∞.4 |

== See also ==
- Rhombitrihexagonal tiling
- Order-3 heptagonal tiling
- Tilings of regular polygons
- List of uniform tilings
- Kagome lattice
