= Disdyakis triacontahedron =

Catalan solid with 120 faces

Disdyakis triacontahedron
(rotating and 3D model)
Type	Catalan
Conway notation	mD or dbD
Coxeter diagram	
Face polygon	scalene triangle
Faces	120
Edges	180
Vertices	62 = 12 + 20 + 30
Face configuration	V4.6.10
Symmetry group	I_{h}, H_{3}, [5,3], (*532)
Rotation group	I, [5,3]^{+}, (532)
Dihedral angle	$\arccos\left(-\frac{7\phi+10}{5\phi+14}\right)$ $\approx 164.888^{\circ}$
Dual polyhedron	truncated icosidodecahedron
Properties	convex, isohedral
net

In geometry, a disdyakis triacontahedron, hexakis icosahedron, decakis dodecahedron, kisrhombic triacontahedron or d120 is a Catalan solid with 120 faces and the dual to the Archimedean truncated icosidodecahedron. As such it is face-uniform but with irregular face polygons. It slightly resembles an inflated rhombic triacontahedron: if one replaces each face of the rhombic triacontahedron with a single vertex and four triangles in a regular fashion, one ends up with a disdyakis triacontahedron. That is, the disdyakis triacontahedron is the Kleetope of the rhombic triacontahedron. It is also the barycentric subdivision of the regular dodecahedron and icosahedron. It has the most faces among the Archimedean and Catalan solids, with the snub dodecahedron, with 92 faces, in second place.

If the bipyramids, the gyroelongated bipyramids, and the trapezohedra are excluded, the disdyakis triacontahedron has the most faces of any other strictly convex polyhedron where every face of the polyhedron has the same shape.

Projected into a sphere, the edges of a disdyakis triacontahedron define 15 great circles. Buckminster Fuller used these 15 great circles, along with 10 and 6 others in two other polyhedra, to define his 31 great circles of the spherical icosahedron.

3D model of a disdyakis triacontahedron

== Geometry ==
Being a Catalan solid with triangular faces, the disdyakis triacontahedron's three face angles $\alpha_4, \alpha_6, \alpha_{10}$ and common dihedral angle $\theta$ must obey the following constraints analogous to other Catalan solids:

$$\sin(\theta/2) = \cos(\pi/4) / \cos(\alpha_4/2)$$
$$\sin(\theta/2) = \cos(\pi/6) / \cos(\alpha_6/2)$$
$$\sin(\theta/2) = \cos(\pi/10) / \cos(\alpha_{10}/2)$$
$$\alpha_4 + \alpha_6 + \alpha_{10} = \pi$$

The above four equations are solved simultaneously to get the following face angles and dihedral angle:

$$\alpha_4 = \arccos \left(\frac{7-4\phi}{30} \right) \approx 88.992^{\circ}$$
$$\alpha_6 = \arccos \left( \frac{17-4\phi}{20}  \right) \approx 58.238^{\circ}$$
$$\alpha_{10} = \arccos \left( \frac{2+5\phi}{12} \right) \approx 32.770^{\circ}$$
$$\theta = \arccos \left( -\frac{155 + 48\phi}{241} \right) \approx 164.888^{\circ}$$

where $\phi = \frac{\sqrt{5}+1}{2} \approx 1.618$ is the golden ratio.

As with all Catalan solids, the dihedral angles at all edges are the same, even though the edges may be of different lengths.

== Cartesian coordinates ==
Disdyakis triacontahedron hulls.

The 62 vertices of a disdyakis triacontahedron are given by:

- Twelve vertices $\left(0, \frac{\pm 1}{\sqrt{\phi+2}} , \frac{\pm \phi}{\sqrt{\phi+2}} \right)$ and their cyclic permutations,
- Eight vertices $\left(\pm R, \pm R, \pm R\right)$,
- Twelve vertices $\left(0, \pm R\phi, \pm \frac{R}{\phi}\right)$ and their cyclic permutations,
- Six vertices $\left(\pm S, 0, 0\right)$ and their cyclic permutations.
- Twenty-four vertices $\left(\pm \frac{S\phi}{2}, \pm\frac{S}{2}, \pm\frac{S}{2\phi}\right)$ and their cyclic permutations,

where

$$R = \frac{5}{3\phi\sqrt{\phi+2}} = \frac{\sqrt{25 - 10\sqrt{5}}}{3} \approx 0.5415328270548438$$,
$S = \frac{(7\phi - 6) \sqrt{\phi+2}}{11} = \frac{(2\sqrt{5} - 3) \sqrt{25 + 10\sqrt{5}}}{11} \approx 0.9210096876986302$, and
$\phi = \frac{1 + \sqrt{5}}{2} \approx 1.618$ is the golden ratio.

In the above coordinates, the first 12 vertices form a regular icosahedron, the next 20 vertices (those with R) form a regular dodecahedron, and the last 30 vertices (those with S) form an icosidodecahedron.

Normalizing all vertices to the unit sphere gives a spherical disdyakis triacontahedron, shown in the adjacent figure. This figure also depicts the 120 transformations associated with the full icosahedral group Ih.

== Symmetry ==
The edges of the polyhedron projected onto a sphere form 15 great circles, and represent all 15 mirror planes of reflective I_{h} icosahedral symmetry. Combining pairs of light and dark triangles define the fundamental domains of the nonreflective (I) icosahedral symmetry. The edges of a compound of five octahedra also represent the 10 mirror planes of icosahedral symmetry.

Disdyakis triacontahedron	Deltoidal hexecontahedron	Rhombic triacontahedron	Dodecahedron	Icosahedron	Pyritohedron

Spherical polyhedron
(see rotating model)	Orthographic projections from 2-, 3- and 5-fold axes
The fundamental domains of icosahedral symmetry form a spherical version of a disdyakis triacontahedron. Each triangle can be mapped to another triangle of the same color by means of a 3D rotation alone. Triangles of different colors can be mapped to each other with a reflection or inversion in addition to rotations.

Stereographic projections
2-fold	3-fold	5-fold	The 5-fold projection is the main drawing on the right page. Max Brückner: Vielecke und Vielflache (1900)
Colored as compound of five octahedra, with 3 great circles for each octahedron. The area in the black circles below corresponds to the frontal hemisphere of the spherical polyhedron.			The 5-fold projection is the main drawing on the right page. Max Brückner: Vielecke und Vielflache (1900)

== Orthogonal projections ==
The disdyakis triacontahedron has three types of vertices which can be centered in orthogonally projection:

Orthogonal projections
Projective symmetry	[2]	[6]	[10]
Image			
Dual image			

== Uses ==
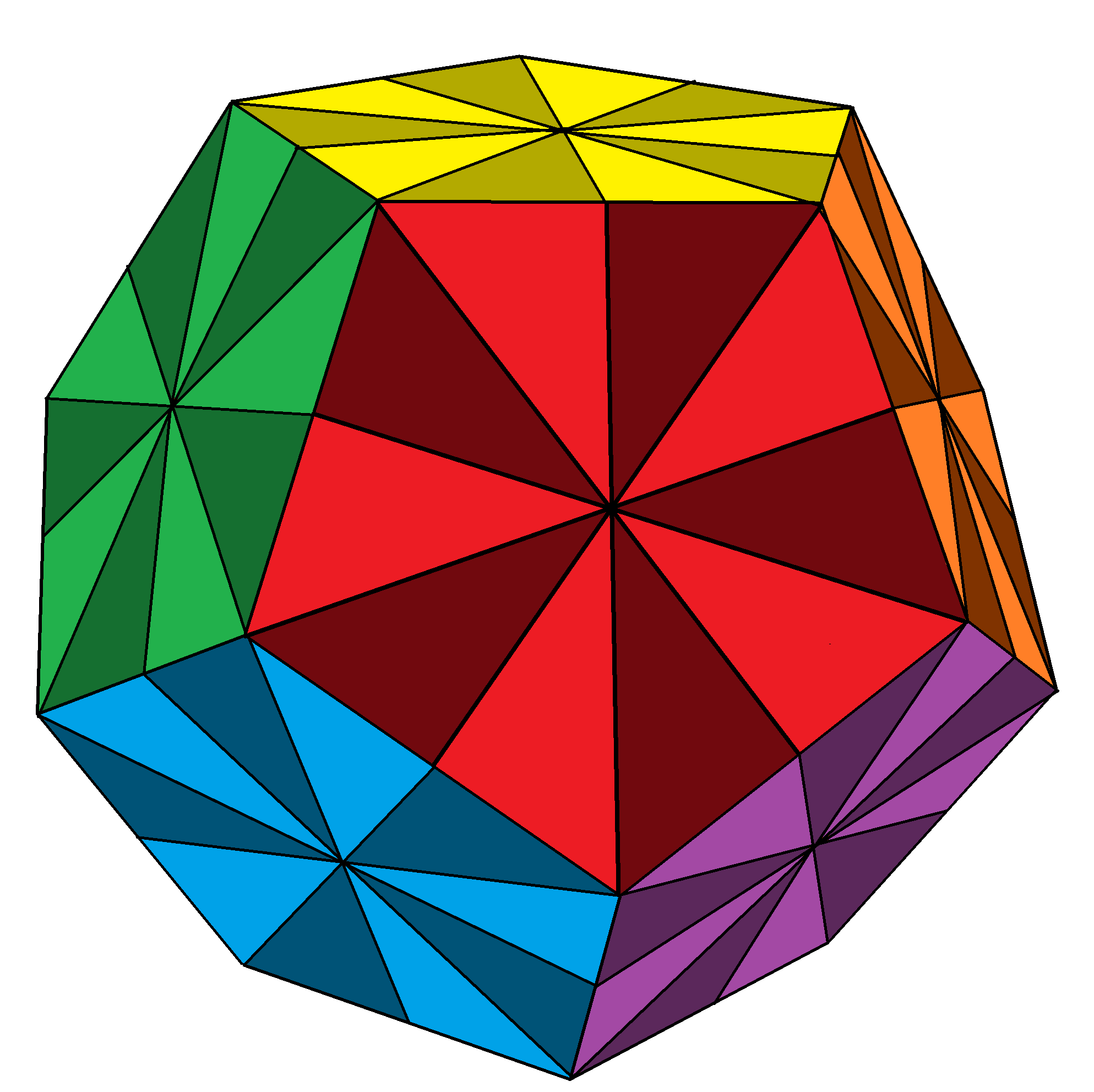
Big Chop puzzle

The disdyakis triacontahedron, as a regular dodecahedron with pentagons divided into 10 triangles each, is considered the "holy grail" for combination puzzles like the Rubik's Cube. Such a puzzle currently has no satisfactory mechanism. It is the most significant unsolved problem in mechanical puzzles, often called the "big chop" problem.

This shape was used to make 120-sided dice using 3D printing.

Since 2016, the Dice Lab has used the disdyakis triacontahedron to mass-market an injection-moulded 120-sided die. It is claimed that 120 is the largest possible number of faces on a fair die, aside from infinite families (such as right regular prisms, bipyramids, and trapezohedra) that would be impractical in reality due to the tendency to roll for a long time.

A disdyakis triacontahedron projected onto a sphere was previously used as the logo for Brilliant, a website containing series of lessons on STEM-related topics.

Because the disdyakis triacontahedron has the highest sphericity of any isohedral figure, it has been studied for its potential use in constructing discrete global grid systems for satellite imaging.

== Related polyhedra and tilings ==
Polyhedra similar to the disdyakis triacontahedron are duals to the Bowtie icosahedron and dodecahedron, containing extra pairs of triangular faces.

Family of uniform icosahedral polyhedra
Symmetry: [5,3], (*532)							[5,3]^{+}, (532)
{5,3}	t{5,3}	r{5,3}	t{3,5}	{3,5}	rr{5,3}	tr{5,3}	sr{5,3}
Duals to uniform polyhedra
V5.5.5	V3.10.10	V3.5.3.5	V5.6.6	V3.3.3.3.3	V3.4.5.4	V4.6.10	V3.3.3.3.5

It is topologically related to a polyhedra sequence defined by the face configuration V4.6.2n. This group is special for having all even number of edges per vertex and form bisecting planes through the polyhedra and infinite lines in the plane, and continuing into the hyperbolic plane for any n ≥ 7.

With an even number of faces at every vertex, these polyhedra and tilings can be shown by alternating two colors so all adjacent faces have different colors.

Each face on these domains also corresponds to the fundamental domain of a symmetry group with order 2,3,n mirrors at each triangle face vertex. This is *n32 in orbifold notation, and [n,3] in Coxeter notation.

*n32 symmetry mutation of omnitruncated tilings: 4.6.2n
Sym. *n32 [n,3]	Spherical				Euclid.	Compact hyperb.		Paraco.	Noncompact hyperbolic			
Sym. *n32 [n,3]	*232 [2,3]	*332 [3,3]	*432 [4,3]	*532 [5,3]	*632 [6,3]	*732 [7,3]	*832 [8,3]	*∞32 [∞,3]	[12i,3]	[9i,3]	[6i,3]	[3i,3]
Figures												
Config.	4.6.4	4.6.6	4.6.8	4.6.10	4.6.12	4.6.14	4.6.16	4.6.∞	4.6.24i	4.6.18i	4.6.12i	4.6.6i
Duals												
Config.	V4.6.4	V4.6.6	V4.6.8	V4.6.10	V4.6.12	V4.6.14	V4.6.16	V4.6.∞	V4.6.24i	V4.6.18i	V4.6.12i	V4.6.6i
