= Triheptagonal tiling =

Semiregular tiling of the hyperbolic plane

Triheptagonal tiling
Poincaré disk model of the hyperbolic plane
Type	Hyperbolic uniform tiling
Vertex configuration	(3.7)^{2}
Schläfli symbol	r{7,3} or $\begin{Bmatrix} 7 \\ 3 \end{Bmatrix}$
Wythoff symbol	2 | 7 3
Coxeter diagram	or
Symmetry group	[7,3], (*732)
Dual	Order-7-3 rhombille tiling
Properties	Vertex-transitive edge-transitive

In geometry, the triheptagonal tiling is a semiregular tiling of the hyperbolic plane, representing a rectified Order-3 heptagonal tiling. There are two triangles and two heptagons alternating on each vertex. It has Schläfli symbol of r{7,3}.

Compare to trihexagonal tiling with vertex configuration 3.6.3.6.

== Images ==
Klein disk model of this tiling preserves straight lines, but distorts angles	The dual tiling is called an Order-7-3 rhombille tiling, made from rhombic faces, alternating 3 and 7 per vertex.

== 7-3 Rhombille ==
7-3 rhombille tiling
- Wallpaper group: [7,3], *732
- Rotation group: [7,3]^{+}, (732)
- Dual: Triheptagonal tiling
- Face configuration: V3.7.3.7
- Properties: edge-transitive face-transitive

In geometry, the 7-3 rhombille tiling is a tessellation of identical rhombi on the hyperbolic plane. Sets of three and seven rhombi meet two classes of vertices.

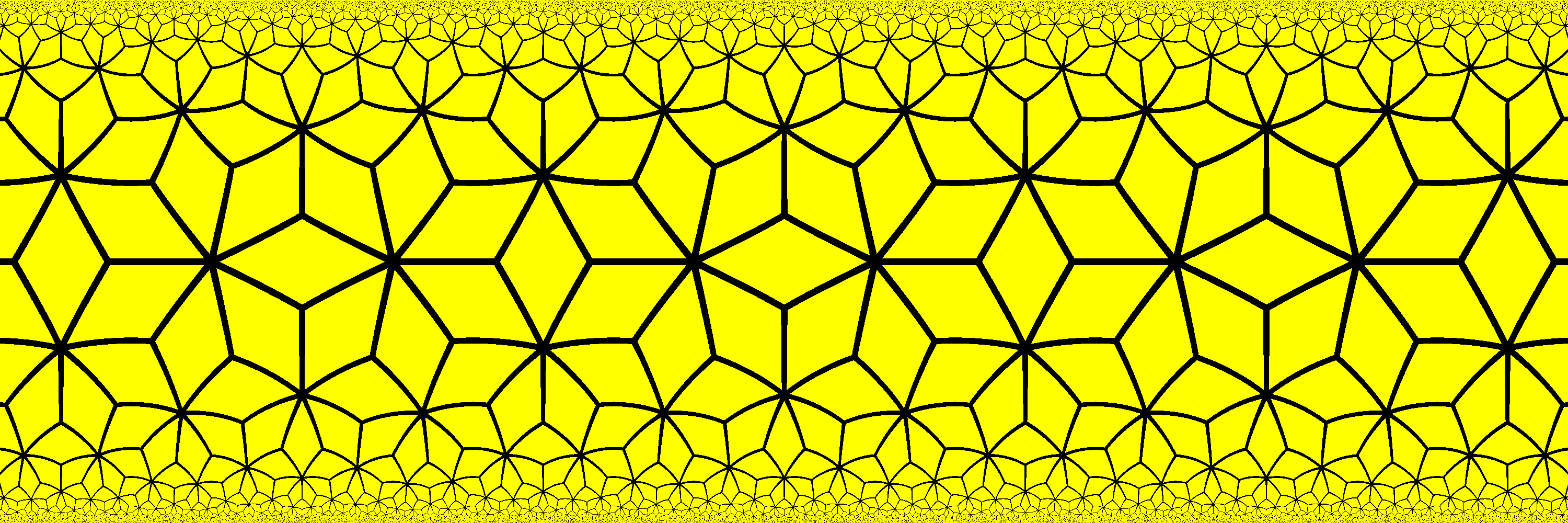
7-3 rhombile tiling in band model

== Related polyhedra and tilings ==
The triheptagonal tiling can be seen in a sequence of quasiregular polyhedrons and tilings:

Quasiregular tilings: (3.n)^{2}
Sym. *n32 [n,3]	Spherical			Euclid.	Compact hyperb.		Paraco.	Noncompact hyperbolic		
Sym. *n32 [n,3]	*332 [3,3] T_{d}	*432 [4,3] O_{h}	*532 [5,3] I_{h}	*632 [6,3] p6m	*732 [7,3]	*832 [8,3]...	*∞32 [∞,3]	[12i,3]	[9i,3]	[6i,3]
Figure										
Figure										
Vertex	(3.3)^{2}	(3.4)^{2}	(3.5)^{2}	(3.6)^{2}	(3.7)^{2}	(3.8)^{2}	(3.∞)^{2}	(3.12i)^{2}	(3.9i)^{2}	(3.6i)^{2}
Schläfli	r{3,3}	r{3,4}	r{3,5}	r{3,6}	r{3,7}	r{3,8}	r{3,∞}	r{3,12i}	r{3,9i}	r{3,6i}
Coxeter										
Dual uniform figures
Dual conf.	V(3.3)^{2}	V(3.4)^{2}	V(3.5)^{2}	V(3.6)^{2}	V(3.7)^{2}	V(3.8)^{2}	V(3.∞)^{2}			

From a Wythoff construction there are eight hyperbolic uniform tilings that can be based from the regular heptagonal tiling.

Drawing the tiles colored as red on the original faces, yellow at the original vertices, and blue along the original edges, there are 8 forms.

Uniform heptagonal/triangular tilings
Symmetry: [7,3], (*732)							[7,3]^{+}, (732)
{7,3}	t{7,3}	r{7,3}	t{3,7}	{3,7}	rr{7,3}	tr{7,3}	sr{7,3}
Uniform duals
V7^{3}	V3.14.14	V3.7.3.7	V6.6.7	V3^{7}	V3.4.7.4	V4.6.14	V3.3.3.3.7

Dimensional family of quasiregular polyhedra and tilings: (7.n)^{2}
Symmetry *7n2 [n,7]	Hyperbolic...						Paracompact	Noncompact
Symmetry *7n2 [n,7]	*732 [3,7]	*742 [4,7]	*752 [5,7]	*762 [6,7]	*772 [7,7]	*872 [8,7]...	*∞72 [∞,7]	[iπ/λ,7]
Coxeter								
Quasiregular figures configuration	3.7.3.7	4.7.4.7	7.5.7.5	7.6.7.6	7.7.7.7	7.8.7.8	7.∞.7.∞	7.∞.7.∞

== See also ==
- Trihexagonal tiling - 3.6.3.6 tiling
  - Rhombille tiling - dual V3.6.3.6 tiling
- Tilings of regular polygons
- List of uniform tilings
