= Pentakis dodecahedron =

Catalan solid with 60 faces

Pentakis dodecahedron
(Click here for rotating model)
Type	Catalan solid
Coxeter diagram	
Conway notation	kD
Face type	V5.6.6 isosceles triangle
Faces	60
Edges	90
Vertices	32
Vertices by type	20{6}+12{5}
Symmetry group	I_{h}, H_{3}, [5,3], (*532)
Rotation group	I, [5,3]^{+}, (532)
Dihedral angle	156°43′07″ arccos(−(80 + 9√5)/109)
Properties	convex, face-transitive
Truncated icosahedron (dual polyhedron)	Net

3D model of a pentakis dodecahedron

In geometry, a pentakis dodecahedron or kisdodecahedron is a polyhedron created by attaching a pentagonal pyramid to each face of a regular dodecahedron; that is, it is the Kleetope of the dodecahedron. Specifically, the term typically refers to a particular Catalan solid, namely the dual of a truncated icosahedron.

== Cartesian coordinates ==
Let $\phi$ be the golden ratio. The 12 points given by $(0, \pm 1, \pm \phi)$ and cyclic permutations of these coordinates are the vertices of a regular icosahedron. Its dual regular dodecahedron, whose edges intersect those of the icosahedron at right angles, has as vertices the points $(\pm 1, \pm 1, \pm 1)$ together with the points $(\pm\phi, \pm 1/\phi, 0)$ and cyclic permutations of these coordinates. Multiplying all coordinates of the icosahedron by a factor of $(3\phi+12)/19\approx 0.887\,057\,998\,22$ gives a slightly smaller icosahedron. The 12 vertices of this icosahedron, together with the vertices of the dodecahedron, are the vertices of a pentakis dodecahedron centered at the origin. The length of its long edges equals $2/\phi$. Its faces are acute isosceles triangles with one angle of $\arccos((-8+9\phi)/18)\approx 68.618\,720\,931\,19^{\circ}$ and two of $\arccos((5-\phi)/6)\approx 55.690\,639\,534\,41^{\circ}$. The length ratio between the long and short edges of these triangles equals $(5-\phi)/3\approx 1.127\,322\,003\,75$.

== Chemistry ==
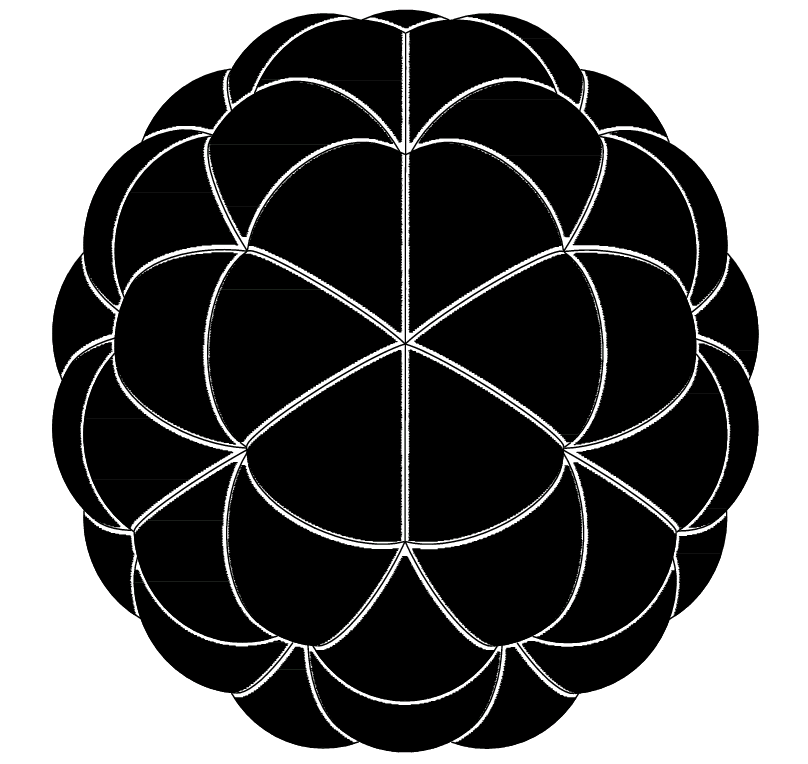
The pentakis dodecahedron in a model of buckminsterfullerene: each (spherical) surface segment represents a carbon atom, and if all are replaced with planar faces, a pentakis dodecahedron is produced. Equivalently, a truncated icosahedron is a model of buckminsterfullerene, with each vertex representing a carbon atom.

== Orthogonal projections ==
The pentakis dodecahedron has three symmetry positions, two on vertices, and one on a midedge:

Orthogonal projections
Projective symmetry	[2]	[6]	[10]
Image			
Dual image			

== Concave pentakis dodecahedron ==
A concave pentakis dodecahedron replaces the pentagonal faces of a dodecahedron with inverted pyramids.

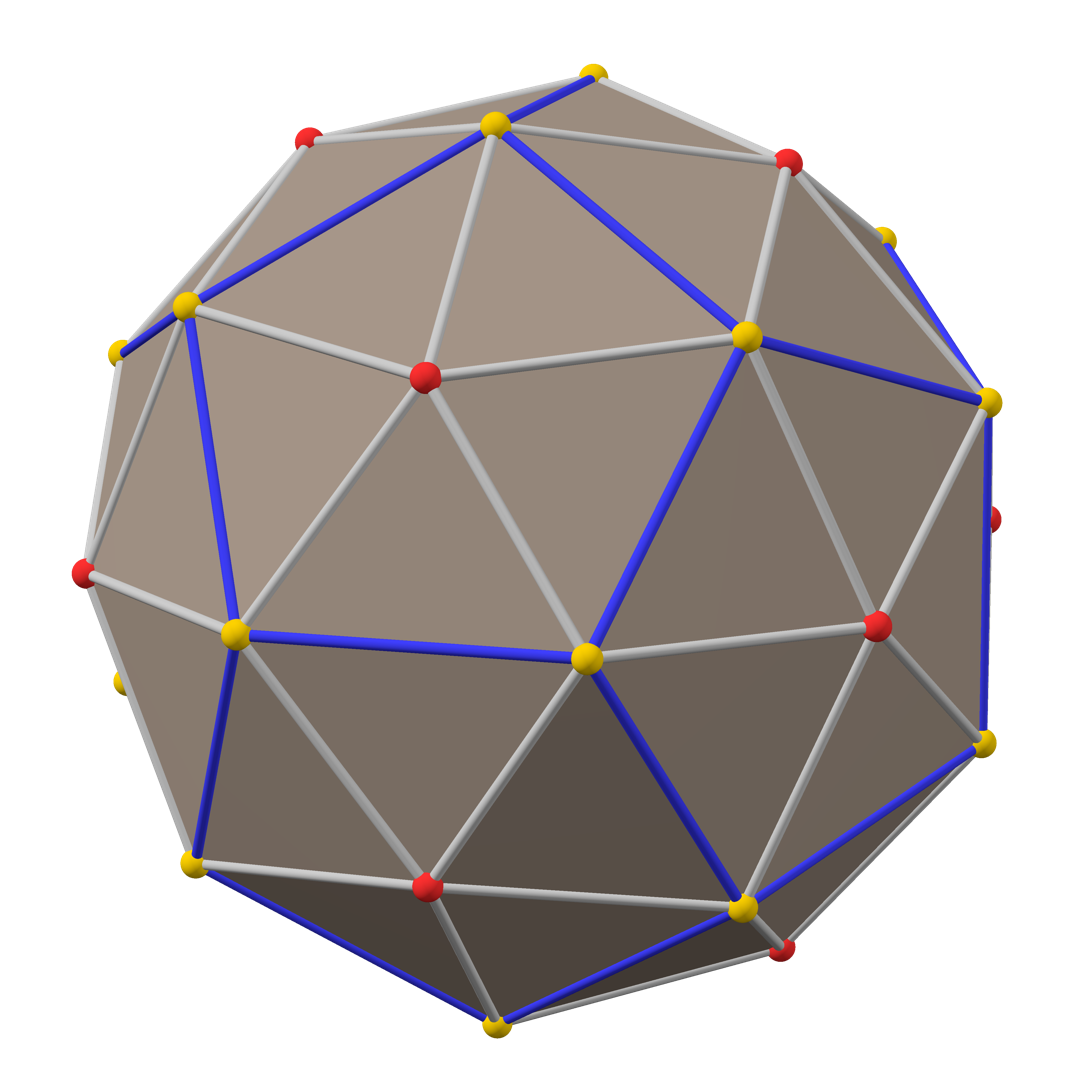
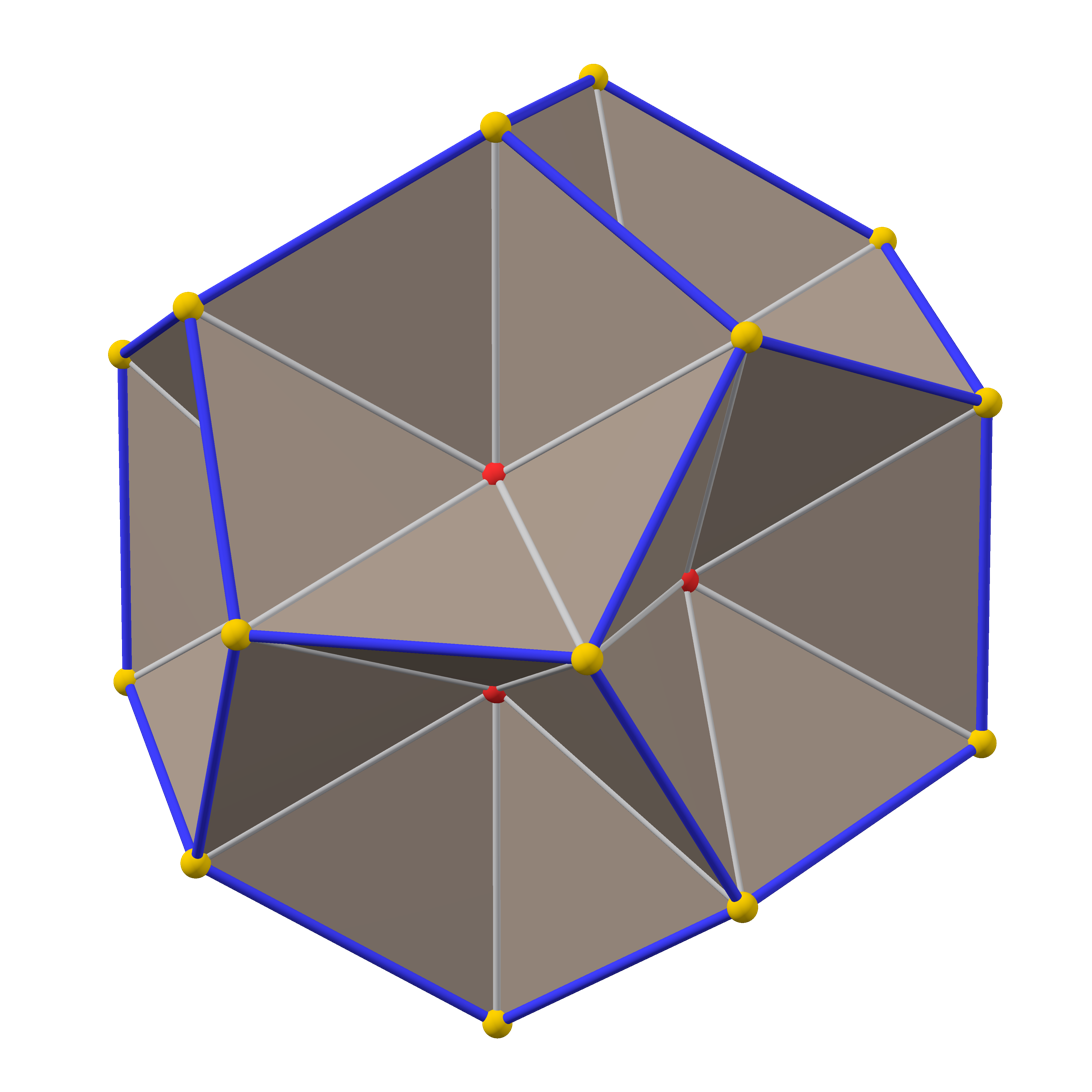
Convex (left) and concave (right) pentakis dodecahedron

== Related polyhedra ==
The faces of a regular dodecahedron may be replaced (or augmented with) any regular pentagonal pyramid to produce what is in general referred to as an elevated dodecahedron. For example, if pentagonal pyramids with equilateral triangles are used, the result is a non-convex deltahedron. Any such elevated dodecahedron has the same combinatorial structure as a pentakis dodecahedron, i.e., the same Schlegel diagram.

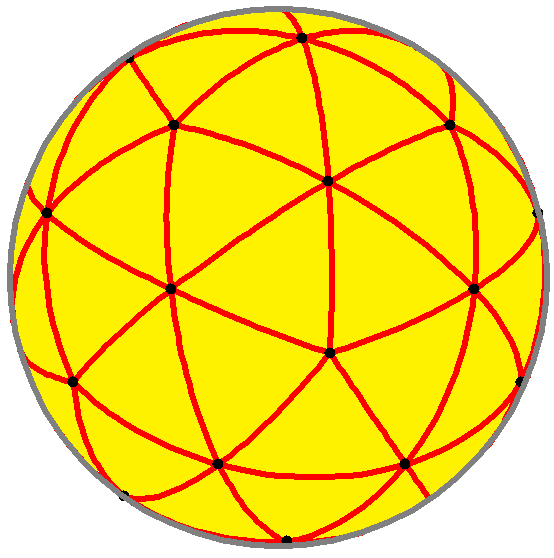
Spherical pentakis dodecahedron

Family of uniform icosahedral polyhedra
Symmetry: [5,3], (*532)							[5,3]^{+}, (532)
{5,3}	t{5,3}	r{5,3}	t{3,5}	{3,5}	rr{5,3}	tr{5,3}	sr{5,3}
Duals to uniform polyhedra
V5.5.5	V3.10.10	V3.5.3.5	V5.6.6	V3.3.3.3.3	V3.4.5.4	V4.6.10	V3.3.3.3.5

*n32 symmetry mutation of truncated tilings: n.6.6
Sym. *n42 [n,3]	Spherical				Euclid.	Compact		Parac.	Noncompact hyperbolic		
Sym. *n42 [n,3]	*232 [2,3]	*332 [3,3]	*432 [4,3]	*532 [5,3]	*632 [6,3]	*732 [7,3]	*832 [8,3]...	*∞32 [∞,3]	[12i,3]	[9i,3]	[6i,3]
Truncated figures											
Config.	2.6.6	3.6.6	4.6.6	5.6.6	6.6.6	7.6.6	8.6.6	∞.6.6	12i.6.6	9i.6.6	6i.6.6
n-kis figures											
Config.	V2.6.6	V3.6.6	V4.6.6	V5.6.6	V6.6.6	V7.6.6	V8.6.6	V∞.6.6	V12i.6.6	V9i.6.6	V6i.6.6

== See also ==
- Excavated dodecahedron

== Cultural references ==
- The Spaceship Earth structure at Walt Disney World's Epcot is a derivative of a pentakis dodecahedron.
- The model for a campus arts workshop designed by Jeffrey Lindsay was actually a hemispherical pentakis dodecahedron https://books.google.com/books?id=JD8EAAAAMBAJ&dq=jeffrey+lindsay&pg=PA92
- The shape of the "Crystal Dome" used in the popular TV game show The Crystal Maze was based on a pentakis dodecahedron.
- In Doctor Atomic, the shape of the first atomic bomb detonated in New Mexico was a pentakis dodecahedron.
- In De Blob 2 in the Prison Zoo, domes are made up of parts of a Pentakis Dodecahedron. These Domes also appear whenever the player transforms on a dome in the Hypno Ray level.
- Some Geodomes in which people play on are Pentakis Dodecahedra, or at least elevated dodecahedra.
