= Heptagonal tiling =

Tiling of the hyperbolic plane

Heptagonal tiling
Poincaré disk model of the hyperbolic plane
Type	Hyperbolic regular tiling
Vertex configuration	7^{3}
Schläfli symbol	{7,3}
Wythoff symbol	3 | 7 2
Coxeter diagram	
Symmetry group	[7,3], (*732)
Dual	Order-7 triangular tiling
Properties	Vertex-transitive, edge-transitive, face-transitive

In geometry, the heptagonal tiling is a regular tiling of the hyperbolic plane. It is represented by Schläfli symbol of {7,3}, having three regular heptagons around each vertex.

== Images ==
Poincaré half-plane model	Poincaré disk model	Beltrami-Klein model

== Related polyhedra and tilings ==
This tiling is topologically related as a part of sequence of regular polyhedra with Schläfli symbol {n,3}.

*n32 symmetry mutation of regular tilings: {n,3}
Spherical				Euclidean	Compact hyperb.		Paraco.	Noncompact hyperbolic			
{2,3}	{3,3}	{4,3}	{5,3}	{6,3}	{7,3}	{8,3}	{∞,3}	{12i,3}	{9i,3}	{6i,3}	{3i,3}

From a Wythoff construction there are eight hyperbolic uniform tilings that can be based from the regular heptagonal tiling.

Drawing the tiles colored as red on the original faces, yellow at the original vertices, and blue along the original edges, there are 8 forms.

Uniform heptagonal/triangular tilings
Symmetry: [7,3], (*732)							[7,3]^{+}, (732)
{7,3}	t{7,3}	r{7,3}	t{3,7}	{3,7}	rr{7,3}	tr{7,3}	sr{7,3}
Uniform duals
V7^{3}	V3.14.14	V3.7.3.7	V6.6.7	V3^{7}	V3.4.7.4	V4.6.14	V3.3.3.3.7

== Hurwitz surfaces ==
The symmetry group of the heptagonal tiling has fundamental domain the (2,3,7) Schwarz triangle, which yields this tiling.

The symmetry group of the tiling is the (2,3,7) triangle group, and a fundamental domain for this action is the (2,3,7) Schwarz triangle. This is the smallest hyperbolic Schwarz triangle, and thus, by the proof of Hurwitz's automorphisms theorem, the tiling is the universal tiling that covers all Hurwitz surfaces (the Riemann surfaces with maximal symmetry group), giving them a tiling by heptagons whose symmetry group equals their automorphism group as Riemann surfaces. The smallest Hurwitz surface is the Klein quartic (genus 3, automorphism group of order 168), and the induced tiling has 24 heptagons, meeting at 56 vertices.

The dual order-7 triangular tiling has the same symmetry group, and thus yields triangulations of Hurwitz surfaces.

== See also ==
- Hexagonal tiling
- List of regular polytopes
- List of uniform planar tilings
- Tilings of regular polygons
