= Disdyakis dodecahedron =

Catalan solid with 48 faces

Disdyakis dodecahedron
(rotating and 3D model)
Type	Catalan solid
Conway notation	mC
Coxeter diagram	
Face polygon	scalene triangle
Faces	48
Edges	72
Vertices	26 = 6 + 8 + 12
Face configuration	V4.6.8
Symmetry group	O_{h}, B_{3}, [4,3], *432
Dihedral angle	155° 4' 56" $\arccos(-\frac{71 + 12\sqrt{2}}{97})$
Dual polyhedron	truncated cuboctahedron
Properties	convex, face-transitive
net

In geometry, a disdyakis dodecahedron, (also hexoctahedron, hexakis octahedron, octakis cube, octakis hexahedron, kisrhombic dodecahedron) or d48, is a Catalan solid with 48 faces and the dual to the Archimedean truncated cuboctahedron. As such it is face-transitive but with irregular face polygons. It resembles an augmented rhombic dodecahedron. Replacing each face of the rhombic dodecahedron with a flat pyramid results in the Kleetope of the rhombic dodecahedron, which looks almost like the disdyakis dodecahedron, and is topologically equivalent to it. (Note: Despite their resemblance, no subset of the disdyakis dodecahedron's vertices forms a rhombic dodecahedron (see #Cartesian coordinates), and therefore, the former is not the Kleetope of the latter. The "rhombic" bases of the pyramids of the disdyakis dodecahedron are in fact not even planar; for example, the vertices of one such rhombus are (a, 0, 0), (0, a, 0), (c, c, c), (c, c, -c) (again, see #Cartesian coordinates for the values of a and c), with diagonal midpoints (√2)×(a, a, 0) and (c, c, 0), which do not coincide.) The net of the rhombic dodecahedral pyramid also shares the same topology.

3D model of a disdyakis dodecahedron

== Symmetry ==
It has O_{h} octahedral symmetry. Its collective edges represent the reflection planes of the symmetry. It can also be seen in the corner and mid-edge triangulation of the regular cube and octahedron, and rhombic dodecahedron.

Disdyakis dodecahedron	Deltoidal icositetrahedron	Rhombic dodecahedron	Hexahedron	Octahedron

Spherical polyhedron
(see rotating model)	Orthographic projections from 2-, 3- and 4-fold axes

The edges of a spherical disdyakis dodecahedron belong to 9 great circles. Three of them form a spherical octahedron (gray in the images below). The remaining six form three square hosohedra (red, green and blue in the images below). They all correspond to mirror planes - the former in dihedral [2,2], and the latter in tetrahedral [3,3] symmetry. A spherical disdyakis dodecahedron can be thought of as the barycentric subdivision of the spherical cube or of the spherical octahedron.

Stereographic projections
2-fold	3-fold	4-fold

== Cartesian coordinates ==
Let $~ a = \frac{1}{1 + 2 \sqrt{2}} ~ {\color{Gray} \approx 0.261}, ~~ b = \frac{1}{2 + 3 \sqrt{2}} ~ {\color{Gray} \approx 0.160}, ~~ c = \frac{1}{3 + 3 \sqrt{2}} ~ {\color{Gray} \approx 0.138}$.
Then the Cartesian coordinates for the vertices of a disdyakis dodecahedron centered at the origin are:

● permutations of (±a, 0, 0) (vertices of an octahedron)
● permutations of (±b, ±b, 0) (vertices of a cuboctahedron)
● (±c, ±c, ±c) (vertices of a cube)

Convex hulls
Combining an octahedron, cube, and cuboctahedron to form the disdyakis dodecahedron. The convex hulls for these vertices scaled by $1/a$ result in Cartesian coordinates of unit circumradius, which are visualized in the figure below:

== Dimensions ==
If its smallest edges have length a, its surface area and volume are

$$\begin{align} A &= \tfrac67\sqrt{783+436\sqrt 2}\,a^2 \\ V &= \tfrac17\sqrt{3\left(2194+1513\sqrt 2\right)}a^3\end{align}$$

The faces are scalene triangles. Their angles are $\arccos\biggl(\frac{1}{6}-\frac{1}{12}\sqrt{2}\biggr) ~{\color{Gray}\approx 87.201^{\circ}}$, $\arccos\biggl(\frac{3}{4}-\frac{1}{8}\sqrt{2}\biggr) ~{\color{Gray}\approx 55.024^{\circ}}$ and $\arccos\biggl(\frac{1}{12}+\frac{1}{2}\sqrt{2}\biggr) ~{\color{Gray}\approx 37.773^{\circ}}$.

== Orthogonal projections ==
The truncated cuboctahedron and its dual, the disdyakis dodecahedron can be drawn in a number of symmetric orthogonal projective orientations. Between a polyhedron and its dual, vertices and faces are swapped in positions, and edges are perpendicular.

Projective symmetry	[4]	[3]	[2]	[2]	[2]	[2]	[2]^{+}
Image							
Dual image							

== Related polyhedra and tilings ==
Polyhedra similar to the disdyakis dodecahedron are duals to the Bowtie octahedron and cube, containing extra pairs of triangular faces.

The disdyakis dodecahedron is one of a family of duals to the uniform polyhedra related to the cube and regular octahedron.

Uniform octahedral polyhedra
Symmetry: [4,3], (*432)							[4,3]^{+} (432)	[1^{+},4,3] = [3,3] (*332)		[3^{+},4] (3*2)
{4,3}	t{4,3}	r{4,3} r{3^{1,1}}	t{3,4} t{3^{1,1}}	{3,4} {3^{1,1}}	rr{4,3} s_{2}{3,4}	tr{4,3}	sr{4,3}	h{4,3} {3,3}	h_{2}{4,3} t{3,3}	s{3,4} s{3^{1,1}}
		=	=	=				= or	= or	=
Duals to uniform polyhedra
V4^{3}	V3.8^{2}	V(3.4)^{2}	V4.6^{2}	V3^{4}	V3.4^{3}	V4.6.8	V3^{4}.4	V3^{3}	V3.6^{2}	V3^{5}

It is a polyhedra in a sequence defined by the face configuration V4.6.2n. This group is special for having all even number of edges per vertex and form bisecting planes through the polyhedra and infinite lines in the plane, and continuing into the hyperbolic plane for any n ≥ 7.

With an even number of faces at every vertex, these polyhedra and tilings can be shown by alternating two colors so all adjacent faces have different colors.

Each face on these domains also corresponds to the fundamental domain of a symmetry group with order 2,3,n mirrors at each triangle face vertex.

*n32 symmetry mutation of omnitruncated tilings: 4.6.2n
Sym. *n32 [n,3]	Spherical				Euclid.	Compact hyperb.		Paraco.	Noncompact hyperbolic			
Sym. *n32 [n,3]	*232 [2,3]	*332 [3,3]	*432 [4,3]	*532 [5,3]	*632 [6,3]	*732 [7,3]	*832 [8,3]	*∞32 [∞,3]	[12i,3]	[9i,3]	[6i,3]	[3i,3]
Figures												
Config.	4.6.4	4.6.6	4.6.8	4.6.10	4.6.12	4.6.14	4.6.16	4.6.∞	4.6.24i	4.6.18i	4.6.12i	4.6.6i
Duals												
Config.	V4.6.4	V4.6.6	V4.6.8	V4.6.10	V4.6.12	V4.6.14	V4.6.16	V4.6.∞	V4.6.24i	V4.6.18i	V4.6.12i	V4.6.6i

*n42 symmetry mutation of omnitruncated tilings: 4.8.2n
Symmetry *n42 [n,4]	Spherical		Euclidean	Compact hyperbolic				Paracomp.
Symmetry *n42 [n,4]	*242 [2,4]	*342 [3,4]	*442 [4,4]	*542 [5,4]	*642 [6,4]	*742 [7,4]	*842 [8,4]...	*∞42 [∞,4]
Omnitruncated figure	4.8.4	4.8.6	4.8.8	4.8.10	4.8.12	4.8.14	4.8.16	4.8.∞
Omnitruncated duals	V4.8.4	V4.8.6	V4.8.8	V4.8.10	V4.8.12	V4.8.14	V4.8.16	V4.8.∞

== See also ==
- First stellation of rhombic dodecahedron
- Disdyakis triacontahedron
- Kisrhombille tiling
- Great rhombihexacron—A uniform dual polyhedron with the same surface topology
