= Order-7 triangular tiling =

Concept in geometry

- Poincaré disk model of the hyperbolic plane
- Type: Hyperbolic regular tiling
- Vertex configuration: $3^7$
- Schläfli symbol: $\{3,7\}$
- Wallpaper group: $[7,3]$, $(^*732)$
- Dual: heptagonal tiling
- Properties: vertex-transitive, edge-transitive, face-transitive

In geometry, the order-7 triangular tiling is a regular tiling of the hyperbolic plane with a Schläfli symbol of {3,7}.

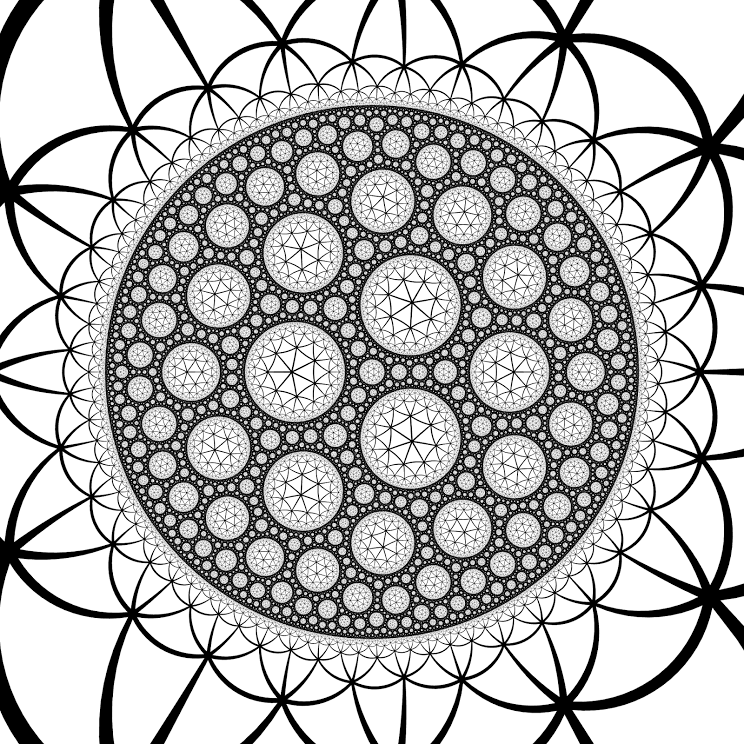
The {3,3,7} honeycomb has {3,7} vertex figures.

== Hurwitz surfaces ==
The symmetry group of the tiling is the (2,3,7) triangle group, and a fundamental domain for this action is the (2,3,7) Schwarz triangle. This is the smallest hyperbolic Schwarz triangle, and thus, by the proof of Hurwitz's automorphisms theorem, the tiling is the universal tiling that covers all Hurwitz surfaces (the Riemann surfaces with maximal symmetry group), giving them a triangulation whose symmetry group equals their automorphism group as Riemann surfaces.

The smallest of these is the Klein quartic, the most symmetric genus 3 surface, together with a tiling by 56 triangles, meeting at 24 vertices, with symmetry group the simple group of order 168, known as PSL(2,7). The resulting surface can in turn be polyhedrally immersed into Euclidean 3-space, yielding the small cubicuboctahedron.

The dual order-3 heptagonal tiling has the same symmetry group, and thus yields heptagonal tilings of Hurwitz surfaces.

The symmetry group of the order-7 triangular tiling has fundamental domain the (2,3,7) Schwarz triangle, which yields this tiling.	The small cubicuboctahedron is a polyhedral immersion of the Klein quartic, which, like all Hurwitz surfaces, is a quotient of this tiling.

== Related polyhedra and tiling ==
It is related to two star-tilings by the same vertex arrangement: the order-7 heptagrammic tiling, {7/2,7}, and heptagrammic-order heptagonal tiling, {7,7/2}.

This tiling is topologically related as a part of sequence of regular polyhedra with Schläfli symbol {3,p}.

*n32 symmetry mutation of regular tilings: {3,n}
Spherical				Euclid.	Compact hyper.		Paraco.	Noncompact hyperbolic			
3.3	3^{3}	3^{4}	3^{5}	3^{6}	3^{7}	3^{8}	3^{∞}	3^{12i}	3^{9i}	3^{6i}	3^{3i}

This tiling is a part of regular series {n,7}:

Tiles of the form {n,7}
Spherical	Hyperbolic tilings							
{2,7}	{3,7}	{4,7}	{5,7}	{6,7}	{7,7}	{8,7}	...	{∞,7}

From a Wythoff construction there are eight hyperbolic uniform tilings that can be based from the regular heptagonal tiling.

Drawing the tiles colored as red on the original faces, yellow at the original vertices, and blue along the original edges, there are 8 forms.

Uniform heptagonal/triangular tilings
Symmetry: [7,3], (*732)							[7,3]^{+}, (732)
{7,3}	t{7,3}	r{7,3}	t{3,7}	{3,7}	rr{7,3}	tr{7,3}	sr{7,3}
Uniform duals
V7^{3}	V3.14.14	V3.7.3.7	V6.6.7	V3^{7}	V3.4.7.4	V4.6.14	V3.3.3.3.7

== See also ==
- Order-7 tetrahedral honeycomb
- List of regular polytopes
- List of uniform planar tilings
- Tilings of regular polygons
- Triangular tiling
- Uniform tilings in hyperbolic plane
