= Wythoff symbol =

Notation for tesselations

Example Wythoff construction triangles with the 7 generator points. Lines to the active mirrors are colored red, yellow, and blue with the 3 nodes opposite them as associated by the Wythoff symbol.

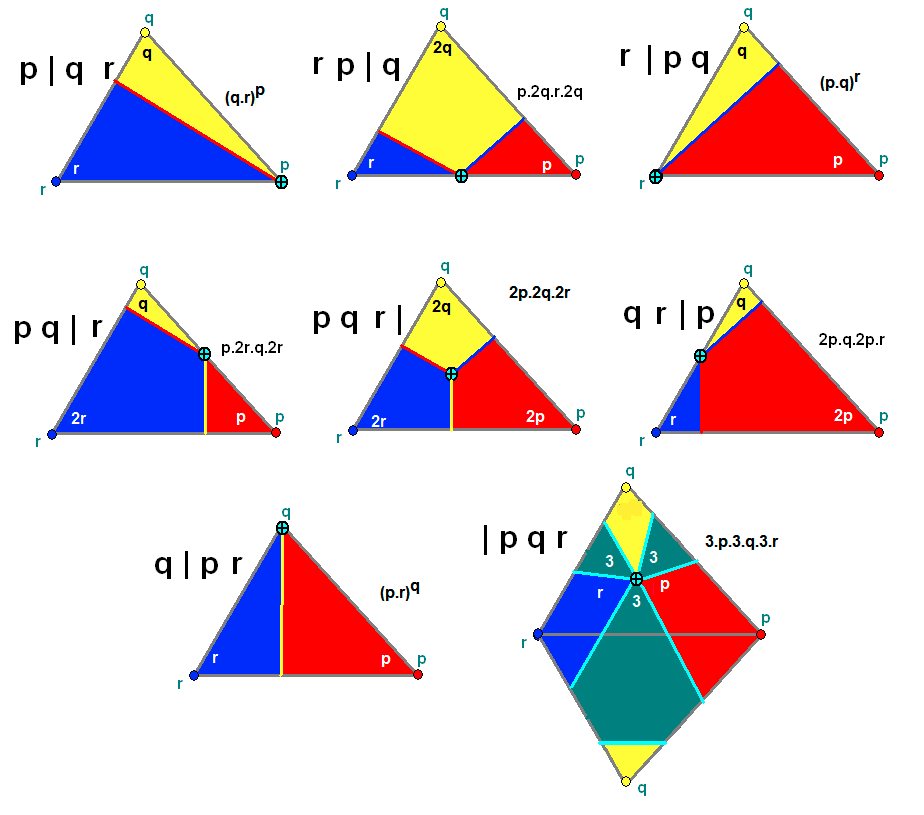
The eight forms for the Wythoff constructions from a general triangle (p q r).

In geometry, the Wythoff symbol is a notation representing a Wythoff construction of a uniform polyhedron or plane tiling within a Schwarz triangle. It was first used by Coxeter, Longuet-Higgins and Miller in their enumeration of the uniform polyhedra. Later the Coxeter diagram was developed to mark uniform polytopes and honeycombs in n-dimensional space within a fundamental simplex.

A Wythoff symbol consists of three numbers and a vertical bar. It represents one uniform polyhedron or tiling, although the same tiling/polyhedron can have different Wythoff symbols from different symmetry generators. For example, the regular cube can be represented by 3 | 2 4 with O_{h} symmetry, and 2 4 | 2 as a square prism with 2 colors and D_{4h} symmetry, as well as 2 2 2 | with 3 colors and D_{2h} symmetry.

With a slight extension, Wythoff's symbol can be applied to all uniform polyhedra. However, the construction methods do not lead to all uniform tilings in Euclidean or hyperbolic space.

== Description ==
The Wythoff construction begins by choosing a generator point on a fundamental triangle. This point must be chosen at equal distance from all edges that it does not lie on, and a perpendicular line is then dropped from it to each such edge.

The three numbers in Wythoff's symbol, p, q, and r, represent the corners of the Schwarz triangle used in the construction, which are π/p, π/q, and π/r radians respectively. The triangle is also represented with the same numbers, written (p q r). The vertical bar in the symbol specifies a categorical position of the generator point within the fundamental triangle according to the following:

- p | q r indicates that the generator lies on the corner p,
- p q | r indicates that the generator lies on the edge between p and q,
- p q r | indicates that the generator lies in the interior of the triangle.

In this notation the mirrors are labeled by the reflection-order of the opposite vertex. The p, q, r values are listed before the bar if the corresponding mirror is active.

A special use is the symbol | p q r which is designated for the case where all mirrors are active, but odd-numbered reflected images are ignored. The resulting figure has rotational symmetry only.

The generator point can either be on or off each mirror, activated or not. This distinction creates 8 (2^{3}) possible forms, but the one where the generator point is on all the mirrors is impossible. The symbol that would normally refer to that is reused for the snub tilings.

The Wythoff symbol is functionally similar to the more general Coxeter-Dynkin diagram, in which each node represents a mirror and the arcs between them – marked with numbers – the angles between the mirrors. (An arc representing a right angle is omitted.) A node is circled if the generator point is not on the mirror.

== Example spherical, euclidean and hyperbolic tilings on right triangles ==
The fundamental triangles are drawn in alternating colors as mirror images. The sequence of triangles (p 3 2) change from spherical (p = 3, 4, 5), to Euclidean (p = 6), to hyperbolic (p ≥ 7). Hyperbolic tilings are shown as a Poincaré disk projection.

Wythoff symbol	q | p 2	2 q | p	2 | p q	2 p | q	p | q 2	p q | 2	p q 2 |	| p q 2
Coxeter diagram								
Vertex figure	p^{q}	q.2p.2p	p.q.p.q	p.2q.2q	q^{p}	p.4.q.4	4.2p.2q	3.3.p.3.q
Fund. triangles	7 forms and snub							
(3 3 2)	3 | 3 2 3^{3}	2 3 | 3 3.6.6	2 | 3 3 3.3.3.3	2 3 | 3 3.6.6	3 | 3 2 3^{3}	3 3 | 2 3.4.3.4	3 3 2 | 4.6.6	| 3 3 2 3.3.3.3.3
(4 3 2)	3 | 4 2 4^{3}	2 3 | 4 3.8.8	2 | 4 3 3.4.3.4	2 4 | 3 4.6.6	4 | 3 2 3^{4}	4 3 | 2 3.4.4.4	4 3 2 | 4.6.8	| 4 3 2 3.3.3.3.4
(5 3 2)	3 | 5 2 5^{3}	2 3 | 5 3.10.10	2 | 5 3 3.5.3.5	2 5 | 3 5.6.6	5 | 3 2 3^{5}	5 3 | 2 3.4.5.4	5 3 2 | 4.6.10	| 5 3 2 3.3.3.3.5
(6 3 2)	3 | 6 2 6^{3}	2 3 | 6 3.12.12	2 | 6 3 3.6.3.6	2 6 | 3 6.6.6	6 | 3 2 3^{6}	6 3 | 2 3.4.6.4	6 3 2 | 4.6.12	| 6 3 2 3.3.3.3.6
(7 3 2)	3 | 7 2 7^{3}	2 3 | 7 3.14.14	2 | 7 3 3.7.3.7	2 7 | 3 7.6.6	7 | 3 2 3^{7}	7 3 | 2 3.4.7.4	7 3 2 | 4.6.14	| 7 3 2 3.3.3.3.7
(8 3 2)	3 | 8 2 8^{3}	2 3 | 8 3.16.16	2 | 8 3 3.8.3.8	2 8 | 3 8.6.6	8 | 3 2 3^{8}	8 3 | 2 3.4.8.4	8 3 2 | 4.6.16	| 8 3 2 3.3.3.3.8
(∞ 3 2)	3 | ∞ 2 ∞^{3}	2 3 | ∞ 3.∞.∞	2 | ∞ 3 3.∞.3.∞	2 ∞ | 3 ∞.6.6	∞ | 3 2 3^{∞}	∞ 3 | 2 3.4.∞.4	∞ 3 2 | 4.6.∞	| ∞ 3 2 3.3.3.3.∞

== See also ==
- Regular polytope
- Regular polyhedron
- List of uniform tilings
- Uniform tilings in hyperbolic plane
- List of uniform polyhedra
- List of uniform polyhedra by Schwarz triangle
- Lists of uniform tilings on the sphere, plane, and hyperbolic plane
