= Truncated order-7 triangular tiling =

Semiregular tiling of the hyperbolic plane

Truncated order-7 triangular tiling
Poincaré disk model of the hyperbolic plane
Type	Hyperbolic uniform tiling
Vertex configuration	7.6.6
Schläfli symbol	t{3,7}
Wythoff symbol	2 7 | 3
Coxeter diagram	
Symmetry group	[7,3], (*732)
Dual	Heptakis heptagonal tiling
Properties	Vertex-transitive

In geometry, the order-7 truncated triangular tiling, sometimes called the hyperbolic soccerball, is a semiregular tiling of the hyperbolic plane. There are two hexagons and one heptagon on each vertex, forming a pattern similar to a conventional soccer ball (truncated icosahedron) with heptagons in place of pentagons. It has Schläfli symbol of t{3,7}.

== Hyperbolic soccerball (football) ==
This tiling is called a hyperbolic soccerball (football) for its similarity to the truncated icosahedron pattern used on soccer balls. Small portions of it as a hyperbolic surface can be constructed in 3-space.

A truncated icosahedron as a polyhedron and a ball	The Euclidean hexagonal tiling colored as truncated triangular tiling	A paper construction of a hyperbolic soccerball

== Dual tiling ==
The dual tiling is called a heptakis heptagonal tiling, named for being constructible as a heptagonal tiling with every heptagon divided into seven triangles by the center point.

== Related tilings ==
This hyperbolic tiling is topologically related as a part of sequence of uniform truncated polyhedra with vertex configurations (n.6.6), and [n,3] Coxeter group symmetry.

*n32 symmetry mutation of truncated tilings: n.6.6
Sym. *n42 [n,3]	Spherical				Euclid.	Compact		Parac.	Noncompact hyperbolic		
Sym. *n42 [n,3]	*232 [2,3]	*332 [3,3]	*432 [4,3]	*532 [5,3]	*632 [6,3]	*732 [7,3]	*832 [8,3]...	*∞32 [∞,3]	[12i,3]	[9i,3]	[6i,3]
Truncated figures											
Config.	2.6.6	3.6.6	4.6.6	5.6.6	6.6.6	7.6.6	8.6.6	∞.6.6	12i.6.6	9i.6.6	6i.6.6
n-kis figures											
Config.	V2.6.6	V3.6.6	V4.6.6	V5.6.6	V6.6.6	V7.6.6	V8.6.6	V∞.6.6	V12i.6.6	V9i.6.6	V6i.6.6

From a Wythoff construction there are eight hyperbolic uniform tilings that can be based from the regular heptagonal tiling.

Drawing the tiles colored as red on the original faces, yellow at the original vertices, and blue along the original edges, there are 8 forms.

Uniform heptagonal/triangular tilings
Symmetry: [7,3], (*732)							[7,3]^{+}, (732)
{7,3}	t{7,3}	r{7,3}	t{3,7}	{3,7}	rr{7,3}	tr{7,3}	sr{7,3}
Uniform duals
V7^{3}	V3.14.14	V3.7.3.7	V6.6.7	V3^{7}	V3.4.7.4	V4.6.14	V3.3.3.3.7

== In popular culture ==
This tiling features prominently in HyperRogue.

== See also ==
- Triangular tiling
- Order-3 heptagonal tiling
- Order-7 triangular tiling
- Tilings of regular polygons
- List of uniform tilings
