= Band model =

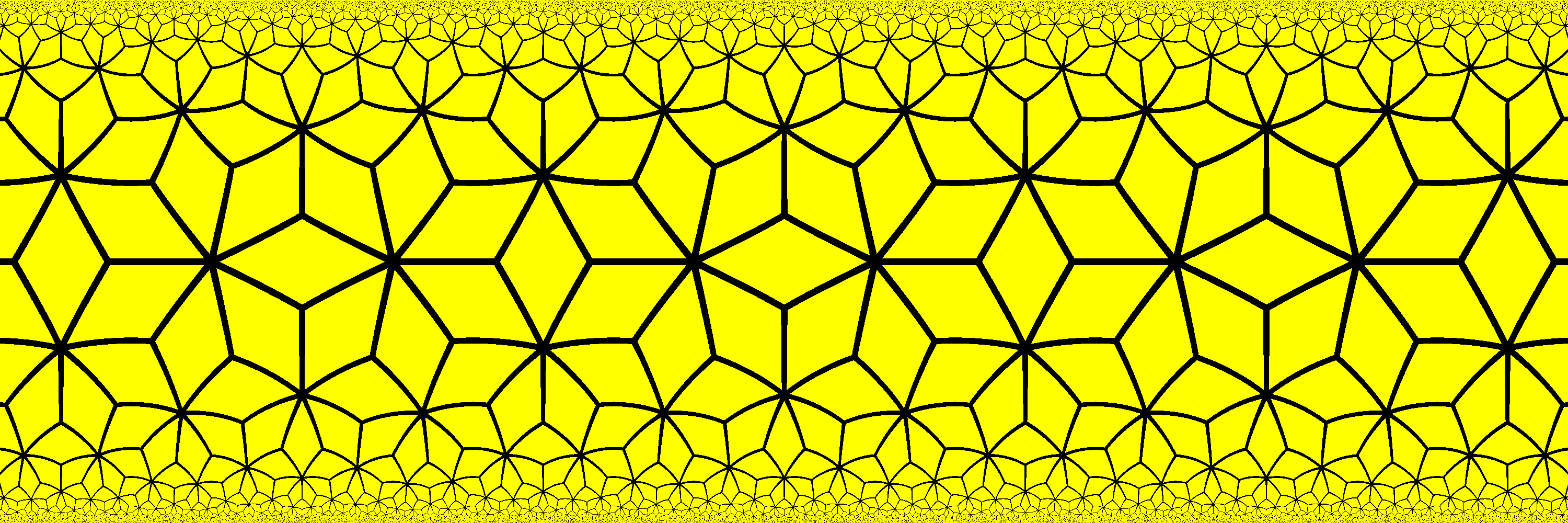
The order 7-3 rhombic tiling shown in a portion of the band model.

The band model is a conformal model of the hyperbolic plane. The band model employs a portion of the Euclidean plane between two parallel lines. Distance is preserved along one line through the middle of the band. Assuming the band is given by $\{z \in \mathbb C: \left|\operatorname {Im} z\right| < \pi / 2\}$, the metric is given by $|dz| \sec (\operatorname{Im} z)$.

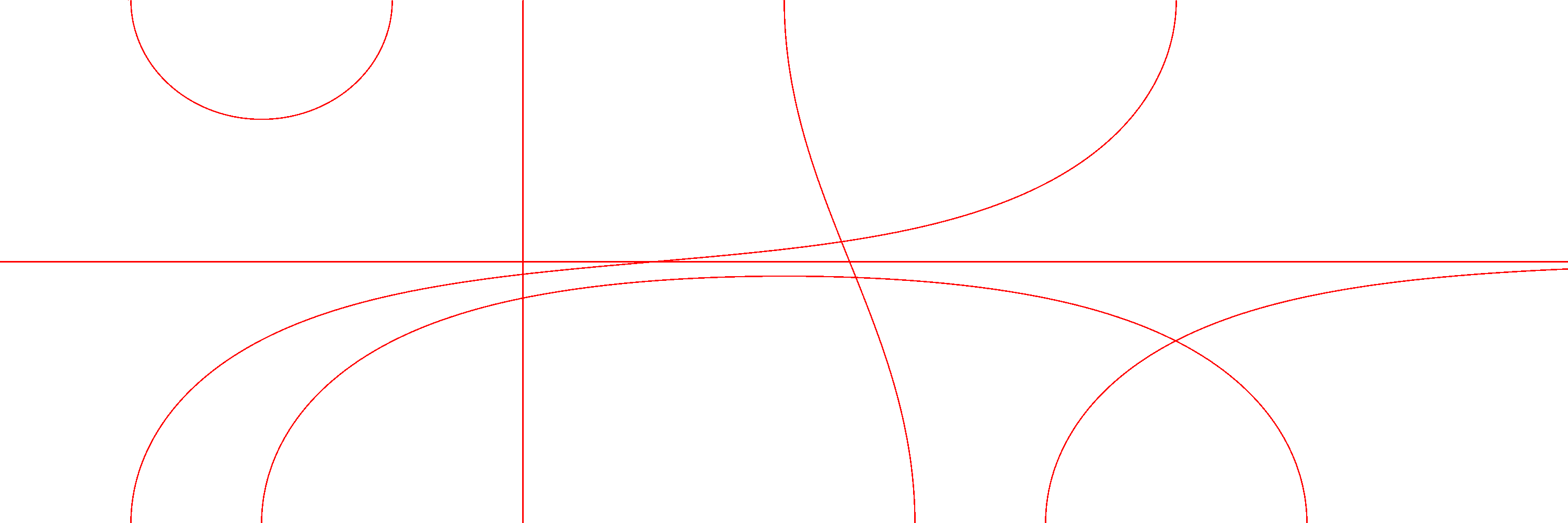
Geodesics shown in a portion of the band model.

Geodesics include the line along the middle of the band, and any open line segment perpendicular to boundaries of the band connecting the sides of the band. Every end of a geodesic either meets a boundary of the band at a right angle or is asymptotic to the midline; the midline itself is the only geodesic that does not meet a boundary. Lines parallel to the boundaries of the band within the band are hypercycles whose common axis is the line through the middle of the band.

== See also ==
- Mercator projection
