= Uniform coloring =

Coloring property of uniform tilings

111	112	123
The hexagonal tiling has 3 uniform colorings.

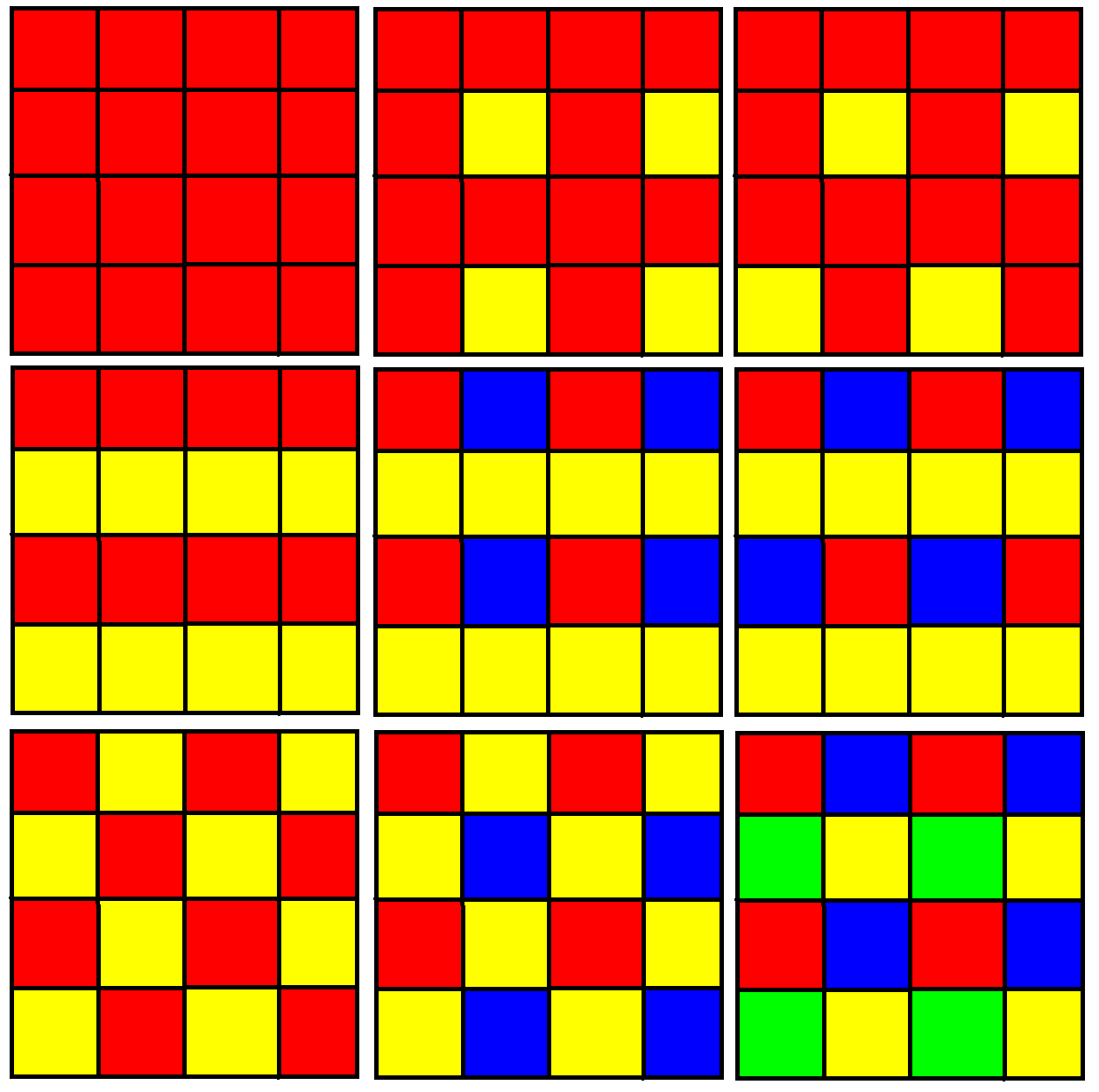
The square tiling has 9 uniform colorings: 1111, 1112(a), 1112(b), 1122, 1123(a), 1123(b), 1212, 1213, 1234.

In geometry, a uniform coloring is a property of a uniform figure (uniform tiling or uniform polyhedron) that is colored to be vertex-transitive. Different symmetries can be expressed on the same geometric figure with the faces following different uniform color patterns.

A uniform coloring can be specified by listing the different colors with indices around a vertex figure.

== n-uniform figures ==
In addition, an n-uniform coloring is a property of a uniform figure which has n types vertex figure, that are collectively vertex transitive.

== Archimedean coloring ==
A related term is Archimedean color requires one vertex figure coloring repeated in a periodic arrangement. A more general term are k-Archimedean colorings which count k distinctly colored vertex figures.

For example, this Archimedean coloring (left) of a triangular tiling has two colors, but requires 4 unique colors by symmetry positions and become a 2-uniform coloring (right):

1-Archimedean coloring 111112	2-uniform coloring 112344 and 121434
