= Wythoff construction =

In geometry, method for constructing a uniform polyhedron or plane tiling

Wythoffian constructions from 3 mirrors forming a right triangle.

In geometry, a Wythoff construction, named after mathematician Willem Abraham Wythoff, is a method for constructing a uniform polyhedron or plane tiling. It is often referred to as Wythoff's kaleidoscopic construction.

== Construction process ==
The method is based on the idea of tiling a sphere, with spherical triangles – see Schwarz triangles. This construction arranges three mirrors at the sides of a triangle, like in a kaleidoscope. However, different from a kaleidoscope, the mirrors are not parallel, but intersect at a single point. They therefore enclose a spherical triangle on the surface of any sphere centered on that point and repeated reflections produce a multitude of copies of the triangle. If the angles of the spherical triangle are chosen appropriately, the triangles will tile the sphere, one or more times.

If one places a vertex at a suitable point inside the spherical triangle enclosed by the mirrors, it is possible to ensure that the reflections of that point produce a uniform polyhedron. For a spherical triangle ABC we have four possibilities which will produce a uniform polyhedron:

1. A vertex is placed at the point A. This produces a polyhedron with Wythoff symbol a|b c, where a equals π divided by the angle of the triangle at A, and similarly for b and c.
2. A vertex is placed at a point on line AB so that it bisects the angle at C. This produces a polyhedron with Wythoff symbol a b|c.
3. A vertex is placed so that it is on the incenter of ABC. This produces a polyhedron with Wythoff symbol a b c|.
4. The vertex is at a point such that, when it is rotated around any of the triangle's corners by twice the angle at that point, it is displaced by the same distance for every angle. Only even-numbered reflections of the original vertex are used. The polyhedron has the Wythoff symbol |a b c.

The process in general also applies for higher-dimensional regular polytopes, including the 4-dimensional uniform 4-polytopes.

Examples
The hexagonal prism is constructed from both the (6 2 2) and (3 2 2) families.	The truncated square tiling is constructed by two different symmetry positions in the (4 4 2) family.	Wythoff pattern pq2| = 432|. Orbit of the Wythoff pattern above under the action of the full octahedral group.

== Non-Wythoffian constructions ==
Uniform polytopes that cannot be created through a Wythoff mirror construction are called non-Wythoffian. They generally can be derived from Wythoffian forms either by alternation (deletion of alternate vertices) or by insertion of alternating layers of partial figures. Both of these types of figures will contain rotational symmetry. Sometimes snub forms are considered Wythoffian, even though they can only be constructed by the alternation of omnitruncated forms.

Examples
The hexagonal antiprism is constructed by an alternation of a dodecagonal prism.	The elongated triangular tiling is constructed by a layering of square tiling and triangular tiling rows.	The great dirhombicosidodecahedron is the only non-Wythoffian uniform polyhedron.

== See also ==
- Coxeter–Dynkin diagram - a generalized symbol for the Wythoff construction of uniform polytopes and honeycombs
- Wythoff symbol - a symbol for the Wythoff construction of uniform polyhedra and uniform tilings
