= Vertex configuration =

Notation for a polyhedron's vertex figure

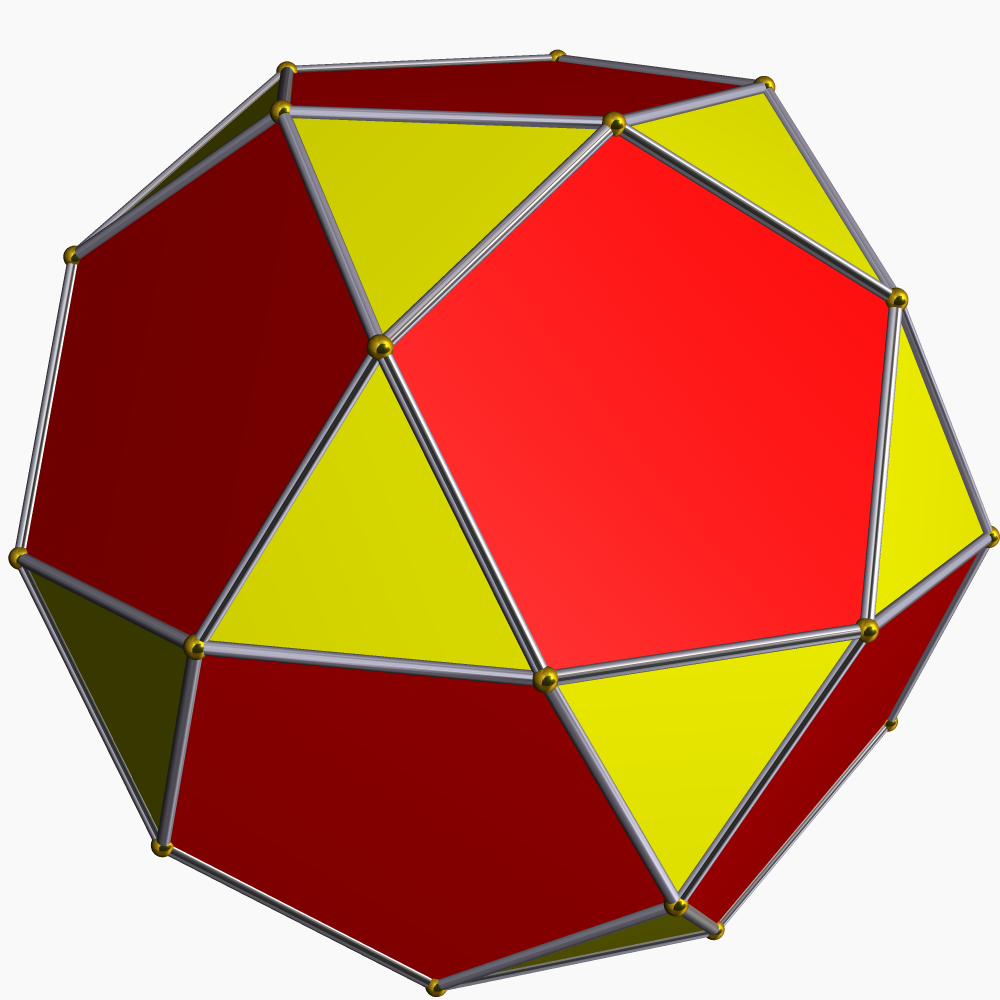
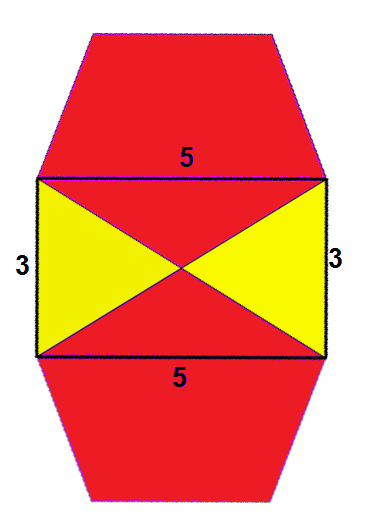
The icosidodecahedron's vertex configeration is $3.5.3.5$ or $(3.5)^2$.

In geometry, a vertex configuration is a shorthand notation for representing a polyhedron or tiling as the sequence of faces around a vertex. It has variously been called a vertex description, vertex type, vertex symbol, vertex arrangement, vertex pattern, face-vector, vertex sequence. It is also called a Cundy and Rollett symbol for its usage for the Archimedean solids in their 1952 book Mathematical Models. For uniform polyhedra, there is only one vertex type and therefore the vertex configuration fully defines the polyhedron. (Chiral polyhedra exist in mirror-image pairs with the same vertex configuration.)

For example, "3.5.3.5" indicates a vertex belonging to 4 faces, alternating triangles and pentagons. This vertex configuration defines the vertex-transitive icosidodecahedron. The notation is cyclic and therefore is equivalent with different starting points, so 3.5.3.5 is the same as 5.3.5.3. The order is important, so 3.3.5.5 is different from 3.5.3.5 (the first has two triangles followed by two pentagons). Repeated elements can be collected as exponents so this example is also represented as (3.5)^{2}.

== Notation ==
Regular vertex figure nets, {p,q} = p^{q}
Tetrahedron {3,3} = 3^{3} Defect 180°	Octahedron {3,4} = 3^{4} Defect 120°	Icosahedron {3,5} = 3^{5} Defect 60°	Triangular tiling {3,6} = 3^{6} Defect 0°
Cube {4,3} Defect 90°	Square tiling {4,4} = 4^{4} Defect 0°	Dodecahedron {5,3} = 5^{3} Defect 36°	Hexagonal tiling {6,3} = 6^{3} Defect 0°
A vertex needs at least 3 faces, and an angle defect. A 0° angle defect will fill the Euclidean plane with regular tiling. By Descartes' theorem, the number of vertices is 720°/defect (4π radians/defect).

A vertex configuration is written as one or more numbers separated by either dots or commas. Each number represents the number of sides in each face that meets at each vertex. An icosidodecahedron is denoted as 3.5.3.5 because there are four faces at each vertex, alternating between triangles (with 3 sides) and pentagons (with 5 sides). This can also be written as (3.5)^{2}.

The vertex configuration can also be considered an expansive form of the simple Schläfli symbol for regular polyhedra. The Schläfli notation has the form {p,q}, where p is the number of sides in each face and q is the number of faces that meet at each vertex. Hence, the Schläfli notation {p,q} can be written as p.p.p••• (where p appears q times), or simply p^{q}.

This notation applies to polygonal tilings as well as polyhedra. A planar vertex configuration denotes a uniform tiling just like a nonplanar vertex configuration denotes a uniform polyhedron.

The notation is ambiguous for chiral forms. For example, the snub cube has clockwise and counterclockwise forms which are identical across mirror images. Both have a 3.3.3.3.4 vertex configuration.

== Star polygons ==
The notation also applies for nonconvex regular faces, the star polygons. For example, a pentagram has the symbol {5/2}, meaning it has 5 sides going around the centre twice.

For example, there are 4 regular star polyhedra with regular polygon or star polygon vertex figures. The small stellated dodecahedron has the Schläfli symbol of {5/2,5} which expands to an explicit vertex configuration 5/2.5/2.5/2.5/2.5/2 or combined as (5/2)^{5}. The great stellated dodecahedron, {5/2,3} has a triangular vertex figure and configuration (5/2.5/2.5/2) or (5/2)^{3}. The great dodecahedron, {5,5/2} has a pentagrammic vertex figure, with vertex configuration is (5.5.5.5.5)/2 or (5^{5})/2. A great icosahedron, {3,5/2} also has a pentagrammic vertex figure, with vertex configuration (3.3.3.3.3)/2 or (3^{5})/2.

{5/2,5} = (5/2)^{5}	{5/2,3} = (5/2)^{3}	3^{4}.5/2	3^{4}.5/3	(3^{4}.5/2)/2
{5,5/2} = (5^{5})/2	{3,5/2} = (3^{5})/2	V.3^{4}.5/2	V3^{4}.5/3	V(3^{4}.5/2)/2

== Inverted polygons ==
Faces on a vertex figure are considered to progress in one direction. Some uniform polyhedra have vertex figures with inversions where the faces progress retrograde. A vertex figure represents this in the star polygon notation of sides p/q such that p<2q, where p is the number of sides and q the number of turns around a circle. For example, "3/2" means a triangle that has vertices that go around twice, which is the same as backwards once. Similarly "5/3" is a backwards pentagram 5/2.

== All uniform vertex configurations of regular convex polygons ==
Semiregular polyhedra have vertex configurations with positive angle defect.

NOTE: The vertex figure can represent a regular or semiregular tiling on the plane if its defect is zero. It can represent a tiling of the hyperbolic plane if its defect is negative.

For uniform polyhedra, the angle defect can be used to compute the number of vertices. Descartes' theorem states that all the angle defects in a topological sphere must sum to 4π radians or 720 degrees.

Since uniform polyhedra have all identical vertices, this relation allows us to compute the number of vertices, which is 4π/defect or 720/defect.

Example: A truncated cube 3.8.8 has an angle defect of 30 degrees. Therefore, it has 720/30 = 24 vertices.

In particular it follows that {a,b} has the following number of vertices:
$$\frac{4}{2 - b(1 -2/a)}$$

Every enumerated vertex configuration potentially uniquely defines a semiregular polyhedron. However, not all configurations are possible.

Topological requirements limit existence. Specifically p.q.r implies that a p-gon is surrounded by alternating q-gons and r-gons, so either p is even or q equals r. Similarly q is even or p equals r, and r is even or p equals q. Therefore, potentially possible triples are:

p.q.r	p = 3 (∴ q = r)	p = 4	p = 5 (∴ q = r)	p = 6
q = 3 (∴ p = r)	3.3.3			
q = 4	3.4.4	4.4.n (n > 2)		
q = 5 (∴ p = r)			5.5.5	
q = 6	3.6.6	4.6.6; 4.6.8; 4.6.10; 4.6.12	5.6.6	6.6.6
q = 8	3.8.8	4.8.8		
q = 10	3.10.10			
q = 12	3.12.12			

In fact, all these configurations with three faces meeting at each vertex turn out to exist.

The number in parentheses is the number of vertices, determined by the angle defect.

Triples

- Platonic solids:
  - Tetrahedron: 3.3.3 (4)
  - Cube: 4.4.4 (8)
  - Dodecahedron: 5.5.5 (20)
- Prisms:
  - n-gonal prism: 4.4.n (2n)
- Archimedean solids:
  - Truncated tetrahedron: 3.6.6 (12)
  - Truncated cube: 3.8.8 (24)
  - Truncated dodecahedron: 3.10.10 (60)
  - Truncated octahedron: 4.6.6 (24)
  - Truncated cuboctahedron: 4.6.8 (48)
  - Truncated icosidodecahedron: 4.6.10 (120)
  - Truncated icosahedron: 5.6.6 (60)
- Regular tilings:
  - Hexagonal tiling: 6.6.6
- Semiregular tilings:
  - Truncated hexagonal tiling: 3.12.12
  - Truncated trihexagonal tiling: 4.6.12
  - Truncated square tiling: 4.8.8

Quadruples

- Platonic solids:
  - Octahedron: 3.3.3.3 (6)
- Antiprisms:
  - n-gonal antiprism: 3.3.3.n (2n)
- Archimedean solids:
  - Cuboctahedron: 3.4.3.4 (12)
  - Icosidodecahedron: 3.5.3.5 (30)
  - Rhombicuboctahedron: 3.4.4.4 (24)
  - Rhombicosidodecahedron: 3.4.5.4 (60)
- Regular tilings:
  - Square tiling: 4.4.4.4
- Semiregular tilings:
  - Trihexagonal tiling: 3.6.3.6
  - Rhombitrihexagonal tiling: 3.4.6.4

Quintuples

- Platonic solids:
  - icosahedron: 3.3.3.3.3 (12)
- Archimedean solids (both chiral):
  - Snub cube: 3.3.3.3.4 (24)
  - Snub dodecahedron: 3.3.3.3.5 (60)
- Semiregular tilings:
  - Snub hexagonal tiling: 3.3.3.3.6 (chiral)
  - Elongated triangular tiling: 3.3.3.4.4
  - Snub square tiling: 3.3.4.3.4 (note that the two different orders of the same numbers give two different patterns)

Sextuples

- Regular tilings:
  - Triangular tiling: 3.3.3.3.3.3

== Face configuration ==
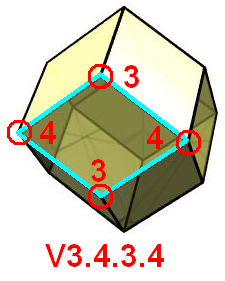
Rhombic dodecahedron

The uniform dual or Catalan solids, including the bipyramids and trapezohedra, are vertically-regular (face-transitive) and so they can be identified by a similar notation which is sometimes called face configuration. Cundy and Rollett prefixed these dual symbols by a V. In contrast, Tilings and patterns uses square brackets around the symbol for isohedral tilings.

This notation represents a sequential count of the number of faces that exist at each vertex around a face. For example, V3.4.3.4 or V(3.4)^{2} represents the rhombic dodecahedron which is face-transitive: every face is a rhombus, and alternating vertices of the rhombus contain 3 or 4 faces each.
