= Rectified truncated dodecahedron =

Convex polyhedron with 92 faces

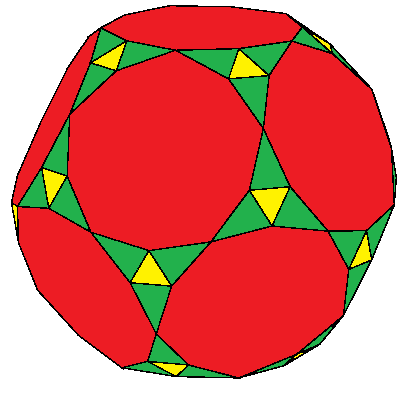
- Faces: 92: 20 equilateral triangles 60 isosceles triangles 12 decagons
- Edges: 180
- Vertices: 90
- Schläfli symbol: rt{5,3}
- Conway notation: atD
- Symmetry group: I_{h}, [5,3], (*532), order 120
- Rotation group: I, [5,3]^{+}, (532), order 60
- Dual polyhedron: Joined truncated dodecahedron
- Properties: convex

Net
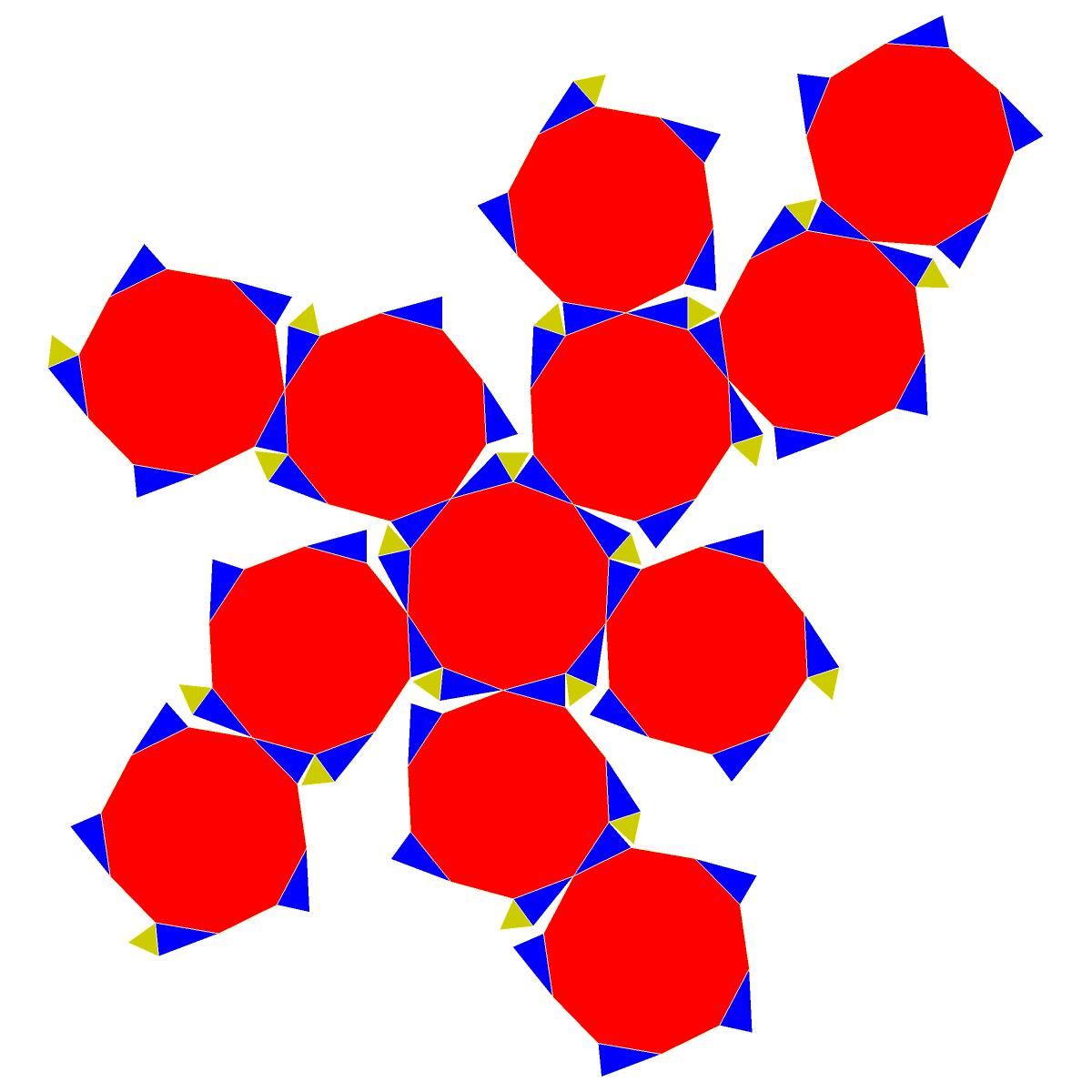

In geometry, the rectified truncated dodecahedron is a convex polyhedron, constructed as a rectified, truncated dodecahedron. It has 92 faces: 20 equilateral triangles, 60 isosceles triangles, and 12 decagons.

Topologically, the triangles corresponding to the dodecahedrons's vertices are always equilateral, although the decagons, while having equal edge lengths, do not have the same edge lengths with the equilateral triangles, having different but alternating angles, causing the other triangles to be isosceles instead.

== Related polyhedra ==
The rectified truncated dodecahedron can be seen in sequence of rectification and truncation operations from the dodecahedron. Further truncation, and alternation operations creates two more polyhedra:

Name	Truncated dodecahedron	Rectified truncated dodecahedron	Truncated rectified truncated dodecahedron	Snub rectified truncated dodecahedron
Coxeter	tD	rtD	trtD	srtD
Conway	tD	atD	btD	stD
Image				

== See also ==
- Rectified truncated tetrahedron
- Rectified truncated octahedron
- Rectified truncated cube
- Rectified truncated icosahedron
