= J68 =

J68 may refer to:

- Augmented truncated dodecahedron
- HMS Sharpshooter (J68), a minesweeper of the Royal Navy
- LNER Class J68, a British steam locomotive class
