= Rectified truncated icosahedron =

Near-miss Johnson solid with 92 faces

- Type: Near-miss Johnson solid
- Faces: 92: 60 isosceles triangles 12 pentagons 20 hexagons
- Edges: 180
- Vertices: 90
- Vertex configuration: 3.6.3.6 3.5.3.6
- Schläfli symbol: rt{3,5}
- Conway notation: atI
- Symmetry group: I_{h}, [5,3], (*532) order 120
- Rotation group: I, [5,3]^{+}, (532), order 60
- Dual polyhedron: Rhombic enneacontahedron
- Properties: convex

Net
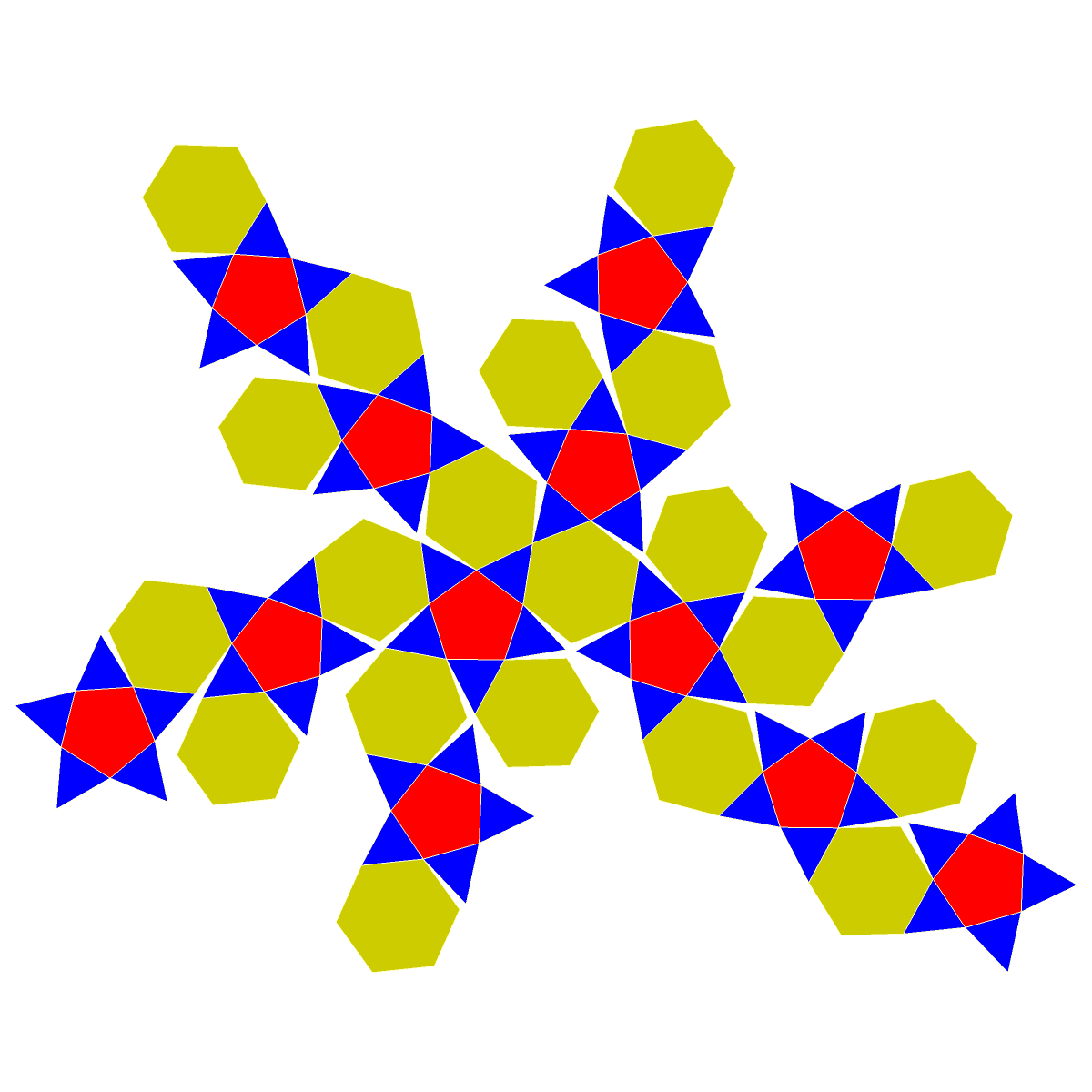

In geometry, the rectified truncated icosahedron is a convex polyhedron. It has 92 faces: 60 isosceles triangles, 12 regular pentagons, and 20 regular hexagons. It is constructed as a rectified, truncated icosahedron, rectification truncating vertices down to mid-edges.

As a near-miss Johnson solid, under icosahedral symmetry, the pentagons are always regular, although the hexagons, while having equal edge lengths, do not have the same edge lengths with the pentagons, having slightly different but alternating angles, causing the triangles to be isosceles instead. The shape is a symmetrohedron with notation I(1,2,*,[2])

== Dual ==
By Conway polyhedron notation, the dual polyhedron can be called a joined truncated icosahedron, jtI, but it is topologically equivalent to the rhombic enneacontahedron with all rhombic faces.

== Related polyhedra ==
The rectified truncated icosahedron can be seen in sequence of rectification and truncation operations from the truncated icosahedron. Further truncation, and alternation operations creates two more polyhedra:

Name	Truncated icosahedron	Truncated truncated icosahedron	Rectified truncated icosahedron	Expanded truncated icosahedron	Omnitruncated truncated icosahedron	Snub truncated icosahedron
Coxeter	tI	ttI	rtI	rrtI	trtI	srtI
Conway	tI	ttI	atI	etI	btI	stI
Image						
Net						
Conway	dtI = kD kD	kdtI	jtI	otI	mtI	gtI
Dual						
Net						

== See also ==
- Near-miss Johnson solid
- Rectified truncated tetrahedron
- Rectified truncated octahedron
- Rectified truncated cube
- Rectified truncated dodecahedron
