= Truncated icosahedron =

Polyhedron resembling a soccerball

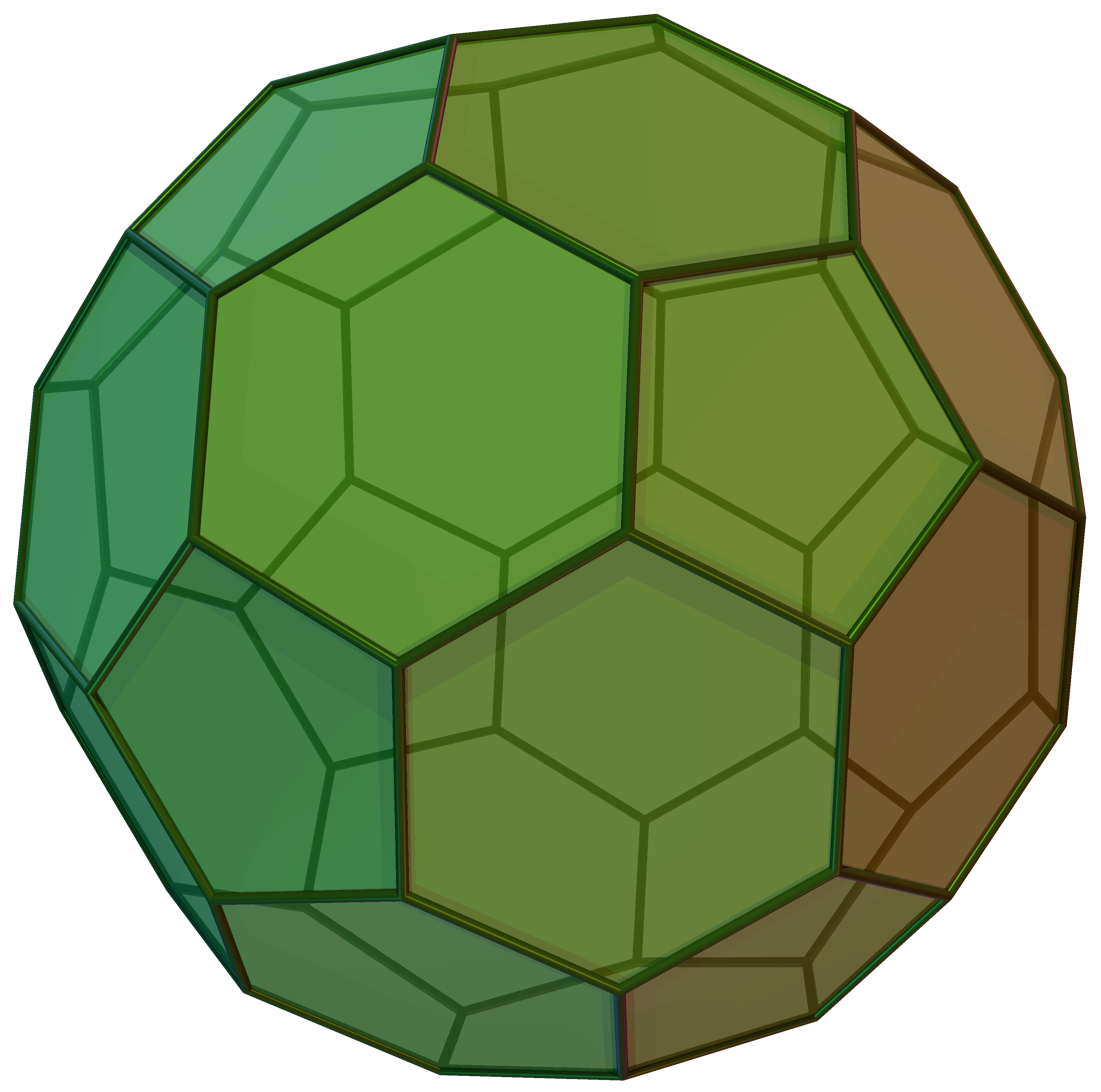
- Type: Archimedean solid Uniform polyhedron Goldberg polyhedron
- Faces: 32
- Edges: 90
- Vertices: 60
- Symmetry group: Icosahedral symmetry $\mathrm{I}_{\mathrm{h}}$
- Dual polyhedron: Pentakis dodecahedron

Vertex figure

Net

3D model of a truncated icosahedron

In geometry, the truncated icosahedron is a polyhedron that can be constructed by truncating all of the regular icosahedron's vertices. The polyhedron can be regarded as a football (UK English) or a soccer ball (US English), typically patterned with white hexagons and black pentagons. Geodesic dome structures, such as those whose architecture Buckminster Fuller pioneered, are often based on this structure. It is an example of an Archimedean solid, as well as a Goldberg polyhedron.

== Construction ==
The truncated icosahedron can be constructed from a regular icosahedron by cutting off all of its vertices, known as truncation. Each of the 12 vertices at the one-third mark of each edge creates 12 pentagonal faces and transforms the original 20 triangular faces into regular hexagons. Therefore, the resulting polyhedron has 32 faces (12 pentagons and 20 hexagons), 90 edges, and 60 vertices.

A Goldberg polyhedron is one whose faces are 12 pentagons and some multiple of 10 hexagons. There are three classes of Goldberg polyhedra, one of which is constructed by repeatedly truncating all of its vertices, and the truncated icosahedron is one of them, denoted as $\operatorname{GP}(1,1)$.

== Properties ==
=== Metric properties ===
The surface area $A$ and the volume $V$ of the truncated icosahedron of edge length $a$ are:
$$\begin{align}
A &= \left ( 20 \cdot \frac32\sqrt{3} + 12 \cdot \frac54\sqrt{ 1 + \frac{2}{\sqrt{5}}} \right) a^2 \approx 72.607a^2 \\
V &= \frac{125+43\sqrt{5}}{4} a^3 \approx 55.288a^3.
\end{align}$$
The sphericity of a polyhedron $\Psi$ describes how closely a polyhedron resembles a sphere. It can be defined as the ratio of the surface area of a sphere with the same volume to the polyhedron's surface area, from which the value is between 0 and 1. In the case of a truncated icosahedron, it is:
$$\Psi = \frac{6\pi^{1/2} V}{A^{3/2}} \approx 0.9504.$$

The dihedral angle of a truncated icosahedron between adjacent hexagonal faces is approximately 138.18°, and that between pentagon-to-hexagon is approximately 142.6°.

The truncated icosahedron is an Archimedean solid, meaning it is a highly symmetric and semi-regular polyhedron, and two or more different regular polygonal faces meet in a vertex. It has the same symmetry as the regular icosahedron, the icosahedral symmetry, and it also has the property of vertex-transitivity. The polygonal faces that meet for every vertex are one pentagon and two hexagons, and the vertex figure of a truncated icosahedron is $5 \cdot 6^2$. The truncated icosahedron's dual is pentakis dodecahedron, a Catalan solid, shares the same symmetry as the truncated icosahedron.

The truncated icosahedron has a Rupert property, meaning that for the same size or a smaller size of it can pass through a hole.

=== Graph ===
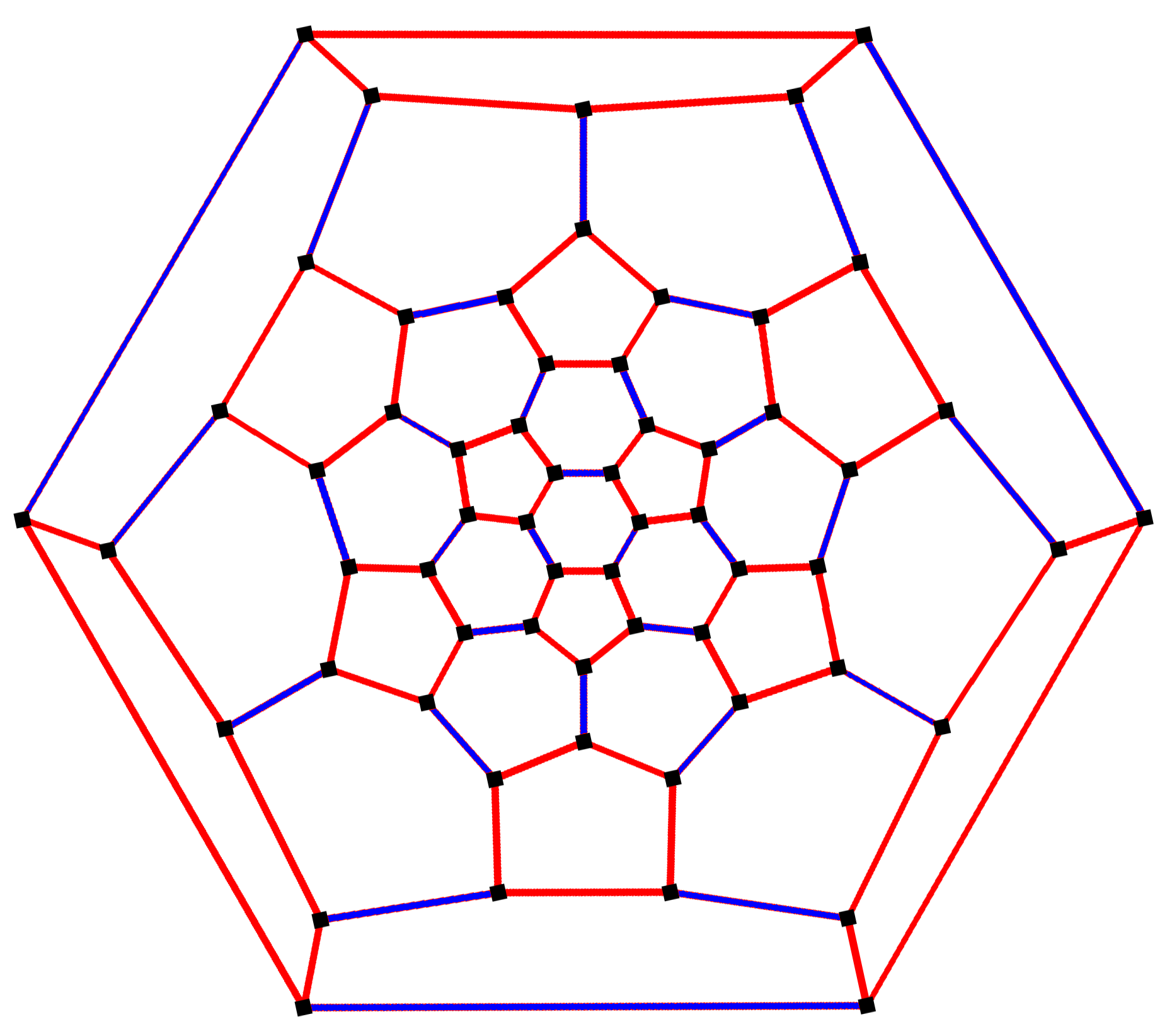
The truncated icosahedral graph

According to Steinitz's theorem, the skeleton of a truncated icosahedron, like that of any convex polyhedron, can be represented as a polyhedral graph, meaning a planar graph (one that can be drawn without crossing edges) and 3-vertex-connected graph (remaining connected whenever two of its vertices are removed). The graph is known as truncated icosahedral graph, and it has 60 vertices and 90 edges. It is an Archimedean graph because it resembles one of the Archimedean solids. It is a cubic graph, meaning that each vertex is incident to exactly three edges.

== Appearance ==
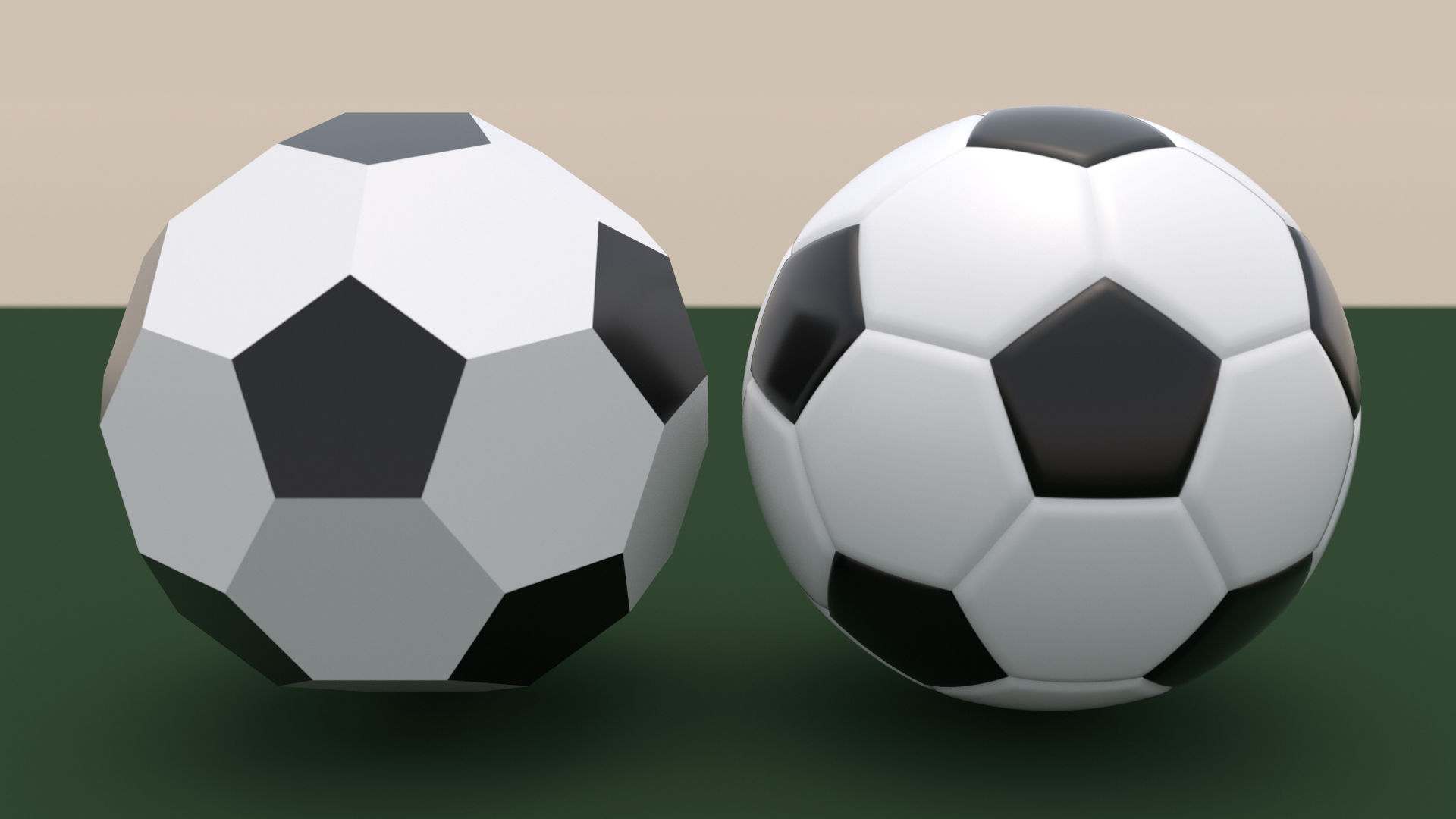
The truncated icosahedron (left) compared with an association football

The balls used in association football and team handball are perhaps the best-known example of a spherical polyhedron analog to the truncated icosahedron, found in everyday life. The ball comprises the same pattern of regular pentagons and regular hexagons, each of which is painted in black and white, respectively; still, its shape is more spherical. It was introduced by Adidas, which debuted the Telstar ball during the World Cup in 1970. However, it was superseded in 2006.

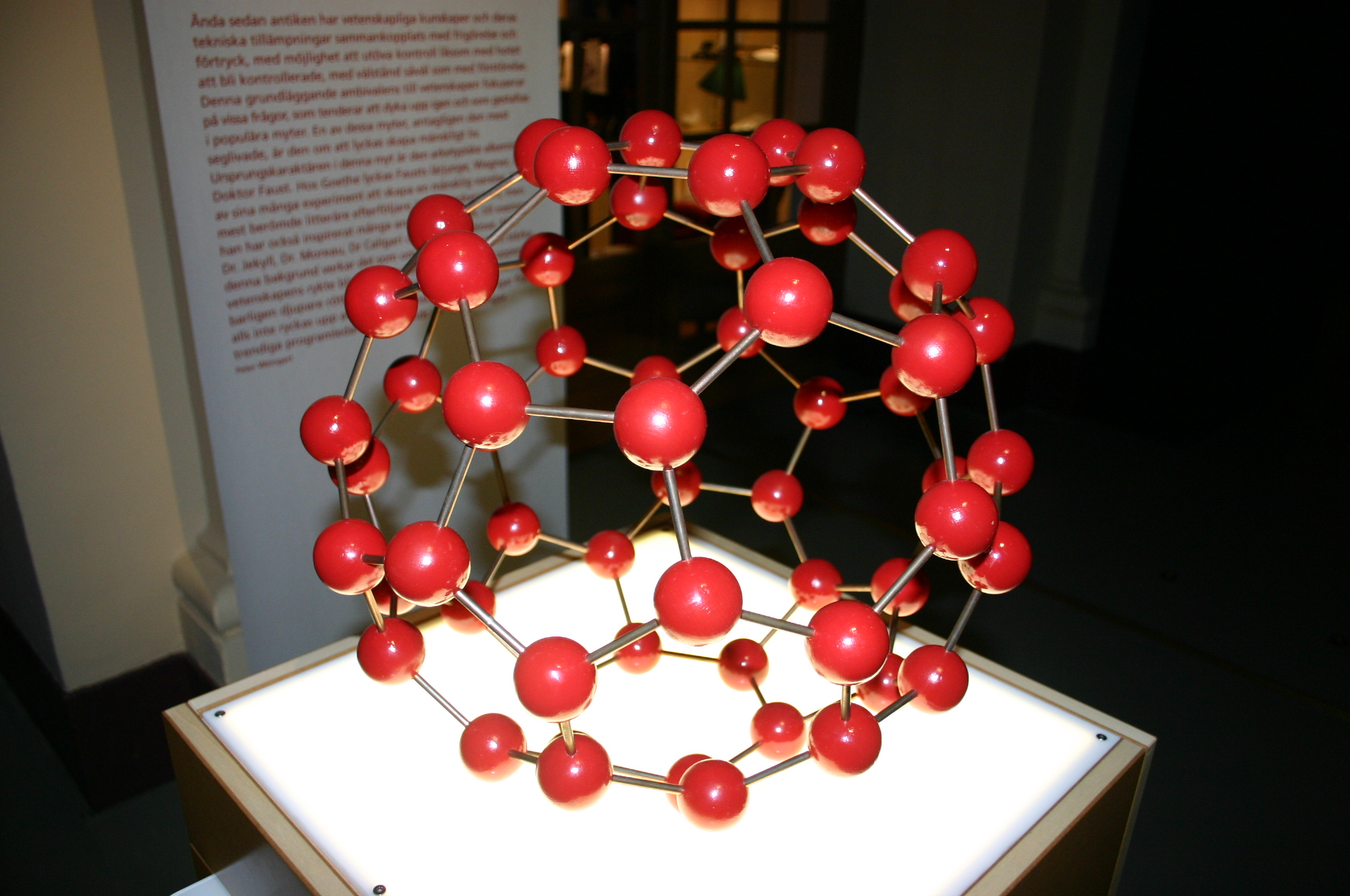
The buckminsterfullerene molecule

Geodesic domes are typically based on triangular facetings of this geometry, with example structures found across the world, popularized by Buckminster Fuller. An example can be found in the model of a buckminsterfullerene or buckyball, a truncated icosahedron-shaped geodesic dome allotrope of elemental carbon discovered in 1985. In other engineering and science applications, its shape was also the configuration of the lenses used for focusing the explosive shock waves of the detonators in both the gadget and Fat Man atomic bombs. Its structure can also be found in the protein of clathrin.

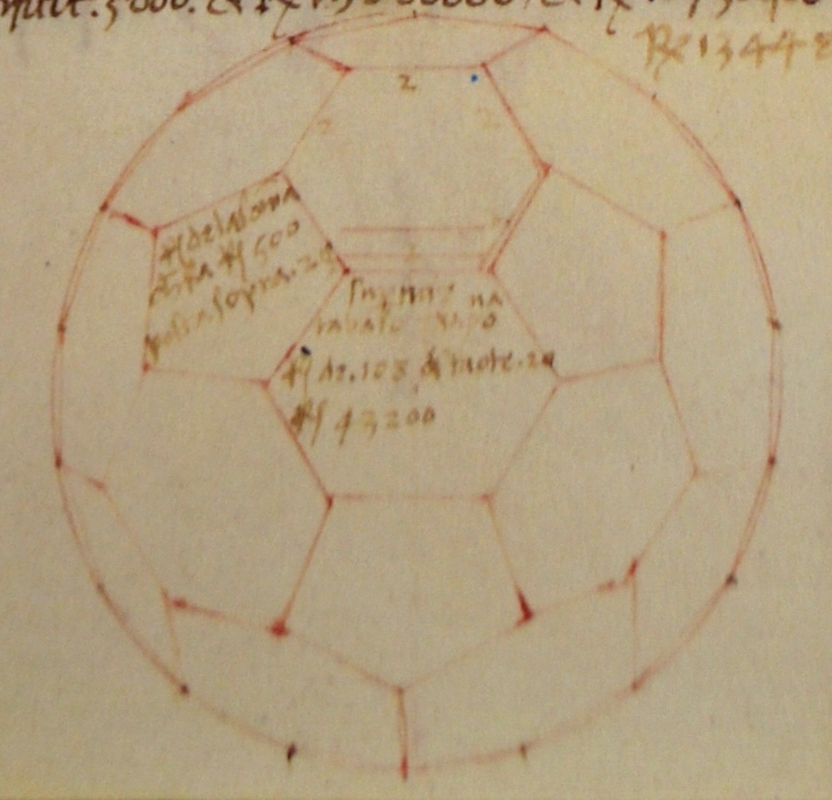
Piero della Francesca's image of a truncated icosahedron from his book De quinque corporibus regularibus

The truncated icosahedron was known to Archimedes, who classified the 13 Archimedean solids in a lost work. All that is now known of his work on these shapes comes from Pappus of Alexandria, who merely lists the numbers of faces for each: 12 pentagons and 20 hexagons, in the case of the truncated icosahedron. The first known image and complete description of a truncated icosahedron are from a rediscovery by Piero della Francesca, in his 15th-century book De quinque corporibus regularibus, which included five of the Archimedean solids (the five truncations of the regular polyhedra). The same shape was depicted by Leonardo da Vinci, in his illustrations for Luca Pacioli's plagiarism of della Francesca's book in 1509. Although Albrecht Dürer omitted this shape from the other Archimedean solids listed in his 1525 book on polyhedra, Underweysung der Messung, a description of it was found in his posthumous papers, published in 1538. Johannes Kepler later rediscovered the complete list of the 13 Archimedean solids, including the truncated icosahedron, and included them in his 1609 book, Harmonices Mundi.

== Related polyhedra ==
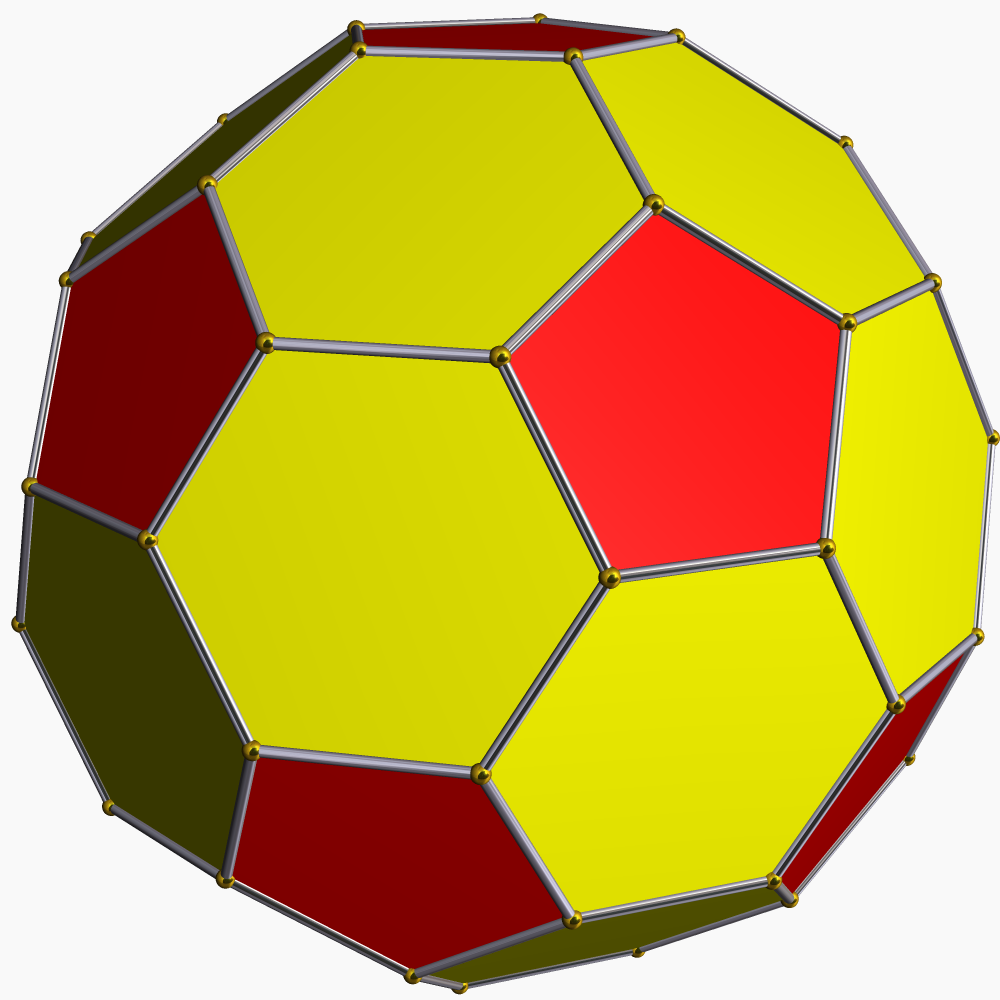
Truncated icosahedron, G(1,1)

Chamfered dodecahedron, G(2,0)

Truncated icosahedra have one hexagon (yellow) between three adjacent pentagons (red) whereas chamfered dodecahedra have three

The truncated icosahedron, which has 32 faces (12 pentagons and 20 hexagons) looks similar to the uniform chamfered dodecahedron (truncated rhombic triacontahedron), which has 42 faces (12 pentagons and 30 hexagons).

== See also ==
- Chamfered dodecahedron
- Icosahedral twins - Nanoparticles which can have the shape of a truncated icosahedron
- Rectified truncated icosahedron
- Truncated dodecahedron
