= Rectified truncated cube =

Convex polyhedron with 38 faces

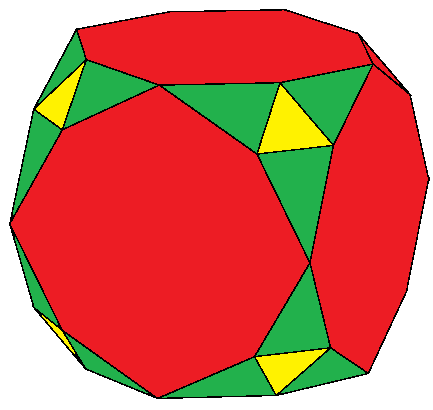
- Faces: 38: 8 equilateral triangles 24 isosceles triangles 6 octagons
- Edges: 72
- Vertices: 12+24
- Schläfli symbol: rt{4,3}
- Conway notation: atC
- Symmetry group: O_{h}, [4,3], (*432), order 48
- Rotation group: O, [4,3]^{+}, (432), order 24
- Dual polyhedron: Joined truncated cube
- Properties: convex

Net
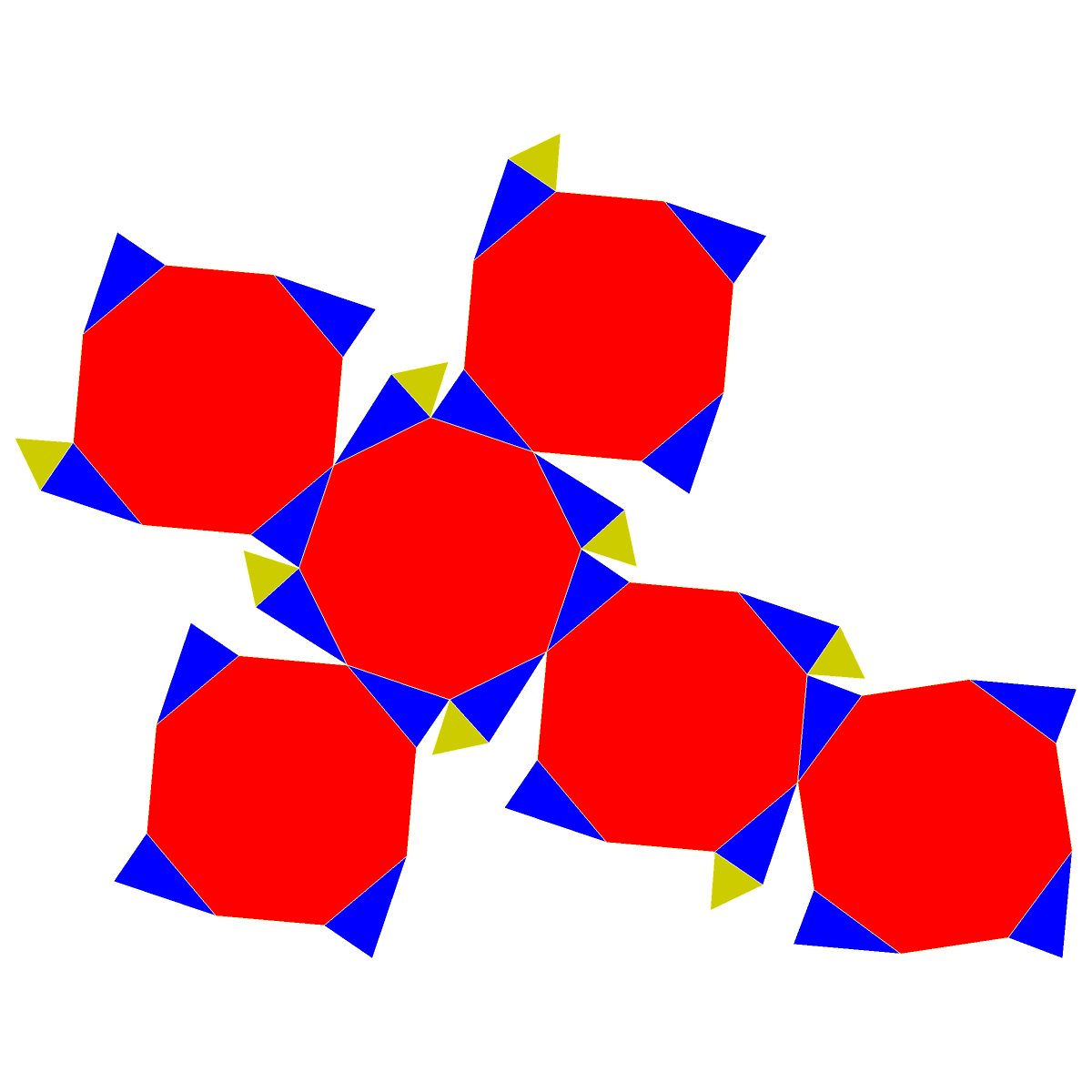

In geometry, the rectified truncated cube is a polyhedron, constructed as a rectified, truncated cube. It has 38 faces: 8 equilateral triangles, 24 isosceles triangles, and 6 octagons.

Topologically, the triangles corresponding to the cube's vertices are always equilateral, although the octagons, while having equal edge lengths, do not have the same edge lengths with the equilateral triangles, having different but alternating angles, causing the other triangles to be isosceles instead.

== Related polyhedra ==
The rectified truncated cube can be seen in sequence of rectification and truncation operations from the cube. Further truncation, and alternation operations creates two more polyhedra:

Name	Truncated cube	Rectified truncated cube	Truncated rectified truncated cube	Snub rectified truncated cube
Coxeter	tC	rtC	trtC	srtC
Conway	tC	atC	btC	stC
Image				

== See also ==
- Rectified truncated tetrahedron
- Rectified truncated octahedron
- Rectified truncated dodecahedron
- Rectified truncated icosahedron
