= Metabiaugmented truncated dodecahedron =

70th Johnson solid (52 faces)

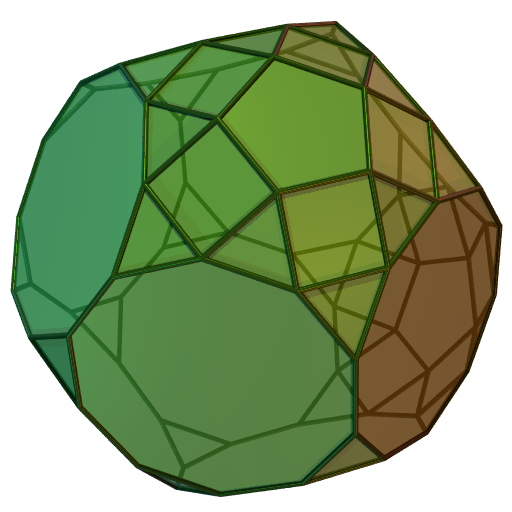
- Type: Johnson; J_{69} – J_{70} – J_{71}
- Faces: 5×2+5×4 triangles 2+2×4 squares 2 pentagons 10 decagons
- Edges: 120
- Vertices: 70
- Vertex configuration: 4×2+8×4(3.10^{2}); 2+2.4(3.4.5.4); 5×4(3.4.3.10)
- Symmetry group: C_{2v}
- Dual polyhedron: -
- Properties: convex

Net
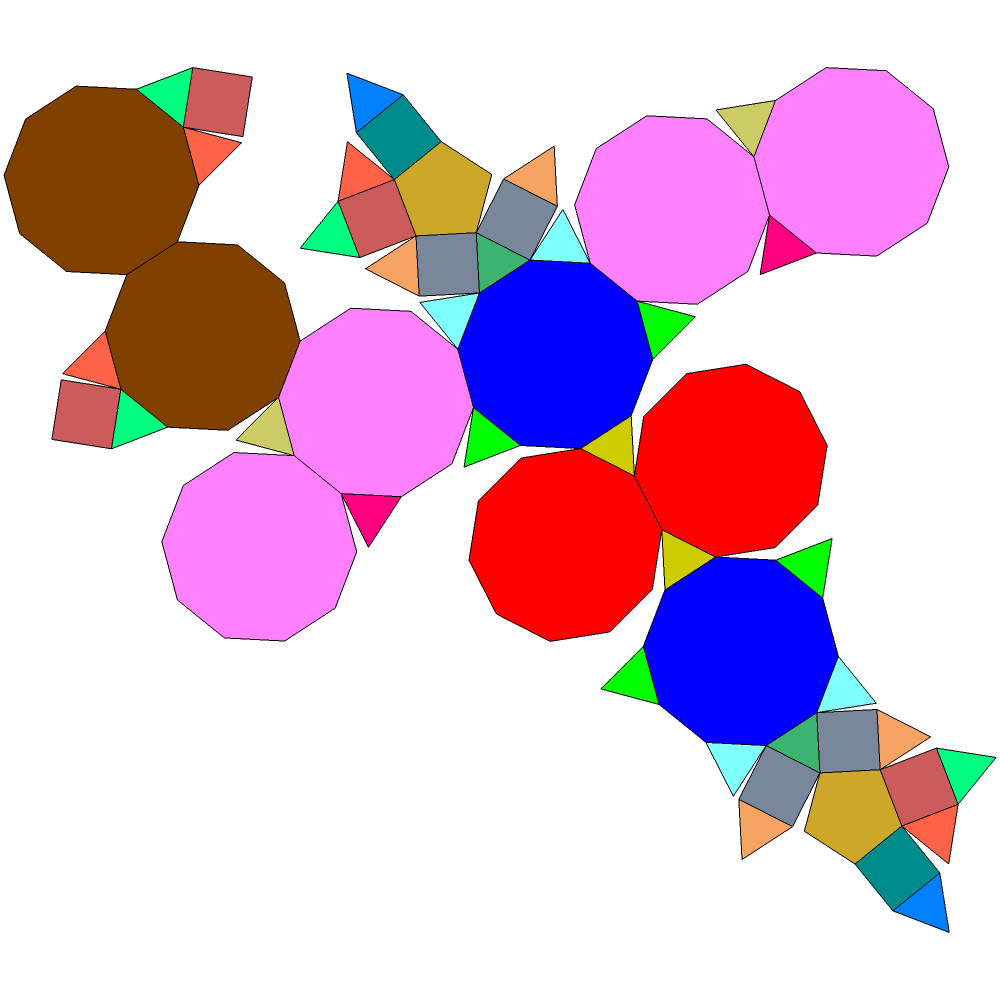

In geometry, the metabiaugmented truncated dodecahedron is one of the Johnson solids (J_{70}). As its name suggests, it is created by attaching two pentagonal cupolas (J_{5}) onto two nonadjacent, nonparallel decagonal faces of a truncated dodecahedron.

A Johnson solid is one of 92 strictly convex polyhedra that are composed of regular polygon faces but are not uniform polyhedra (that is, they are not Platonic solids, Archimedean solids, prisms, or antiprisms). They were named by Norman Johnson, who first listed these polyhedra in 1966.

3D model of a metabiaugmented truncated dodecahedron
