= Rectified truncated octahedron =

Convex polyhedron with 38 faces

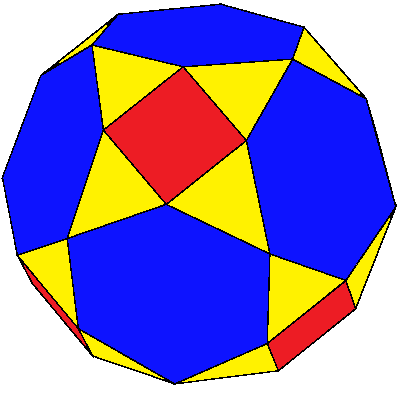
- Faces: 38: 24 isosceles triangles 6 squares 8 hexagons
- Edges: 72
- Vertices: 12+24
- Schläfli symbol: rt{3,4}
- Conway notation: atO
- Symmetry group: O_{h}, [4,3], (*432), order 48
- Rotation group: O, [4,3]^{+}, (432), order 24
- Dual polyhedron: Joined truncated octahedron
- Properties: convex

Net
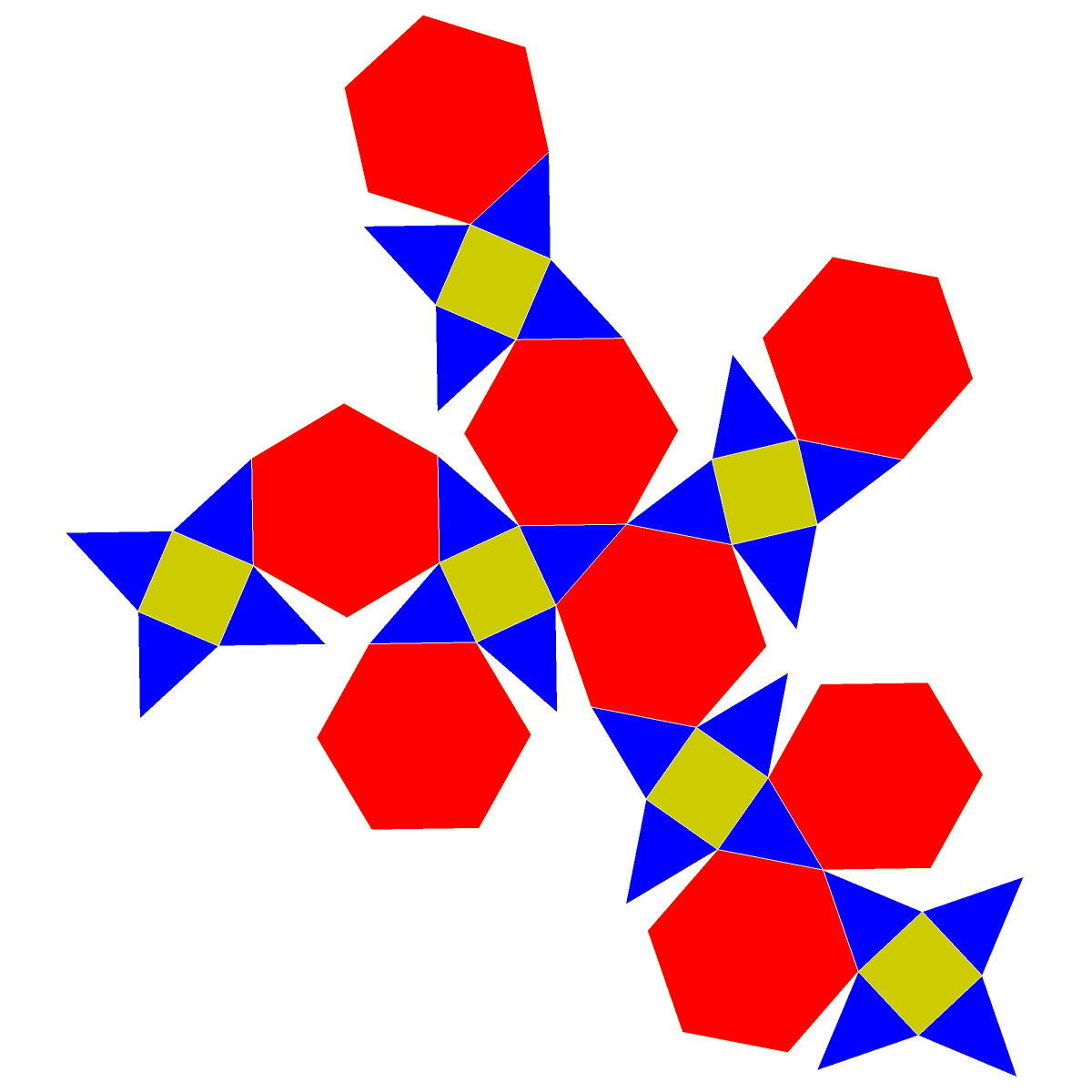

In geometry, the rectified truncated octahedron is a convex polyhedron, constructed as a rectified, truncated octahedron. It has 38 faces: 24 isosceles triangles, 6 squares, and 8 hexagons.

Topologically, the squares corresponding to the octahedron's vertices are always regular, although the hexagons, while having equal edge lengths, do not have the same edge lengths with the squares, having different but alternating angles, causing the triangles to be isosceles instead.

== Related polyhedra ==
The rectified truncated octahedron can be seen in sequence of rectification and truncation operations from the octahedron. Further truncation, and alternation creates two more polyhedra:

Name	Truncated octahedron	Rectified truncated octahedron	Truncated rectified truncated octahedron	Snub rectified truncated octahedron
Coxeter	tO	rtO	trtO	srtO
Conway	tO	atO	btO	stO
Image				
Conway	dtO = kC	jtO	mtO	gtO
Dual				

== See also ==
- Rectified truncated tetrahedron
- Rectified truncated cube
- Rectified truncated dodecahedron
- Rectified truncated icosahedron
