= Rectified truncated tetrahedron =

Convex polyhedron with 20 faces

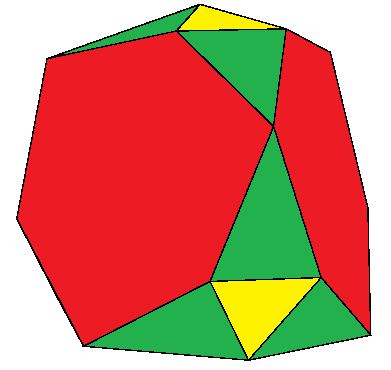
- Faces: 20: 4 equilateral triangles 12 isosceles triangles 4 hexagons
- Edges: 48
- Vertices: 12+18
- Schläfli symbol: rt{3,3}
- Conway notation: atT
- Symmetry group: T_{d}, [3,3], (*332), order 24
- Rotation group: T, [3,3]^{+}, (332), order 12
- Dual polyhedron: Joined truncated tetrahedron
- Properties: convex

Net
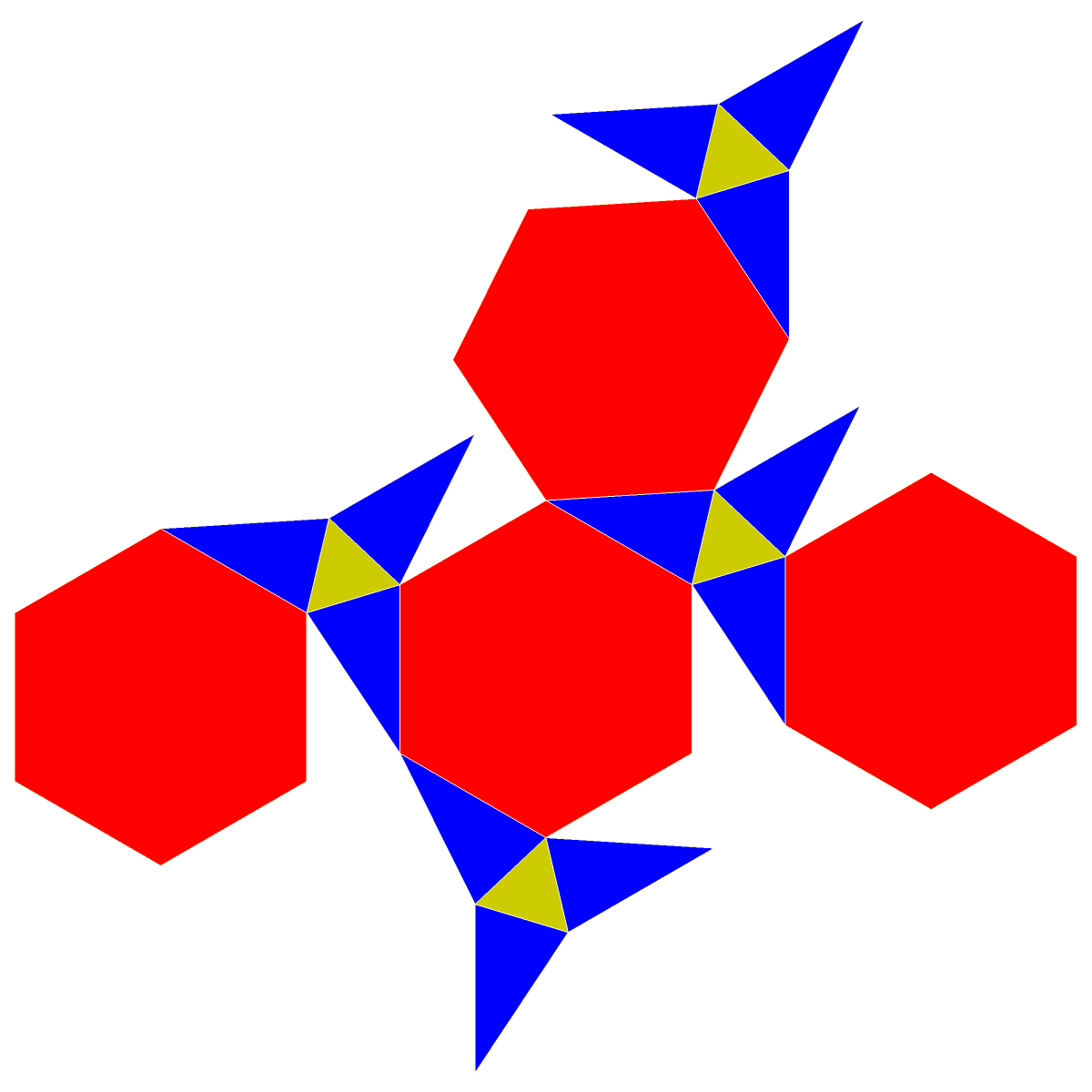

In geometry, the rectified truncated tetrahedron is a polyhedron, constructed as a rectified, truncated tetrahedron. It has 20 faces: 4 equilateral triangles, 12 isosceles triangles, and 4 regular hexagons.

Topologically, the triangles corresponding to the tetrahedron's vertices are always equilateral, although the hexagons, while having equal edge lengths, do not have the same edge lengths with the equilateral triangles, having different but alternating angles, causing the other triangles to be isosceles instead.

== Related polyhedra ==
The rectified truncated tetrahedron can be seen in sequence of rectification and truncation operations from the tetrahedron. Further truncation, and alternation operations creates two more polyhedra:

Name	Truncated tetrahedron	Rectified truncated tetrahedron	Truncated rectified truncated tetrahedron	Snub rectified truncated tetrahedron
Coxeter	tT	rtT	trtT	srtT
Conway	tT	atT	btT	stT
Image				
Conway	dtT = kT	jtT	mtT	gtT
Dual				

== See also ==
- Rectified truncated cube
- Rectified truncated octahedron
- Rectified truncated dodecahedron
- Rectified truncated icosahedron
