= Parabiaugmented truncated dodecahedron =

69th Johnson solid (52 faces)

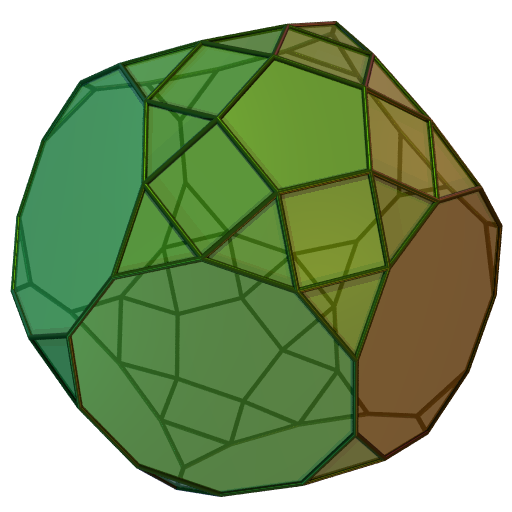
- Type: Johnson; J_{68} – J_{69} – J_{70}
- Faces: 3×10 triangles 10 squares 2 pentagons 10 decagons
- Edges: 120
- Vertices: 70
- Vertex configuration: 2×10+20(3.10^{2}); 10(3.4.5.4); 20(3.4.3.10)
- Symmetry group: D_{5d}
- Dual polyhedron: -
- Properties: convex

Net
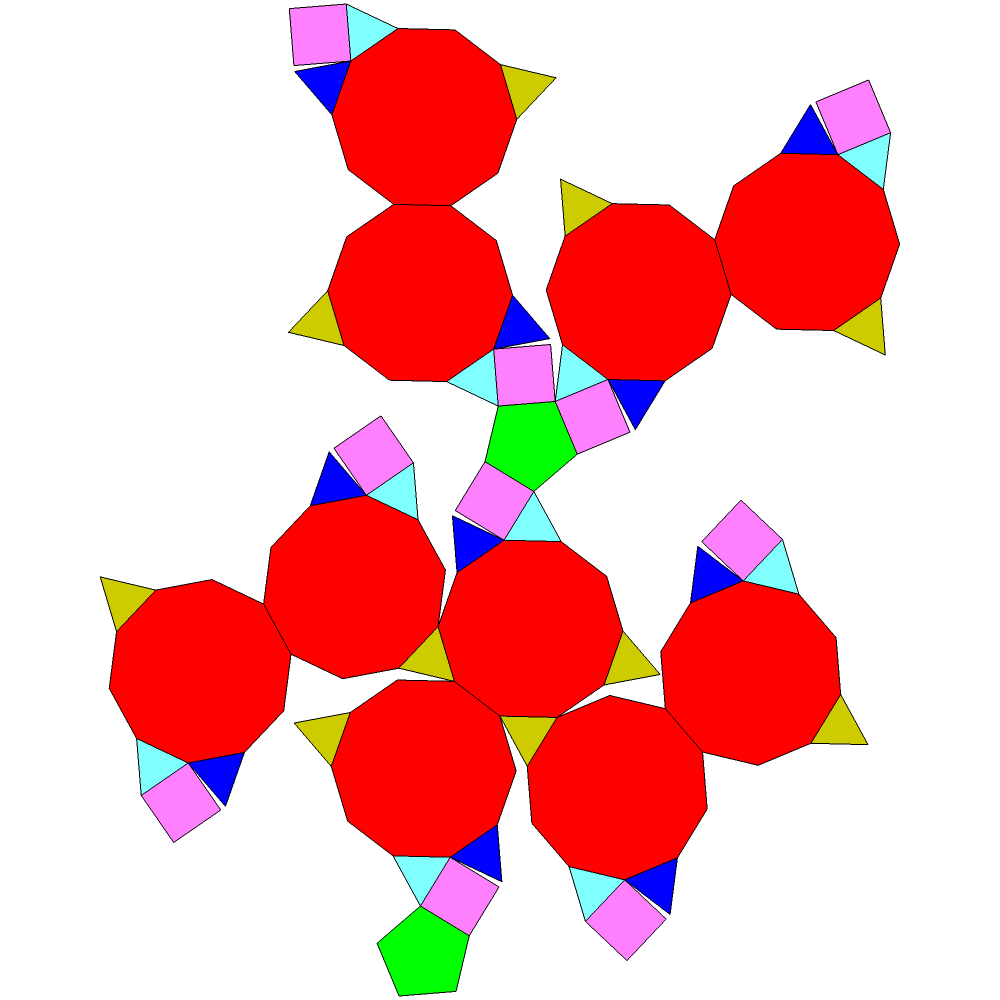

In geometry, the parabiaugmented truncated dodecahedron is one of the Johnson solids (J_{69}). As its name suggests, it is created by attaching two pentagonal cupolas (J_{5}) onto two parallel decagonal faces of a truncated dodecahedron.

A Johnson solid is one of 92 strictly convex polyhedra that are composed of regular polygon faces but are not uniform polyhedra (that is, they are not Platonic solids, Archimedean solids, prisms, or antiprisms). They were named by Norman Johnson, who first listed these polyhedra in 1966.

3D model of a parabiaugmented truncated dodecahedron
