= Truncated dodecahedron =

Archimedean solid with 32 faces

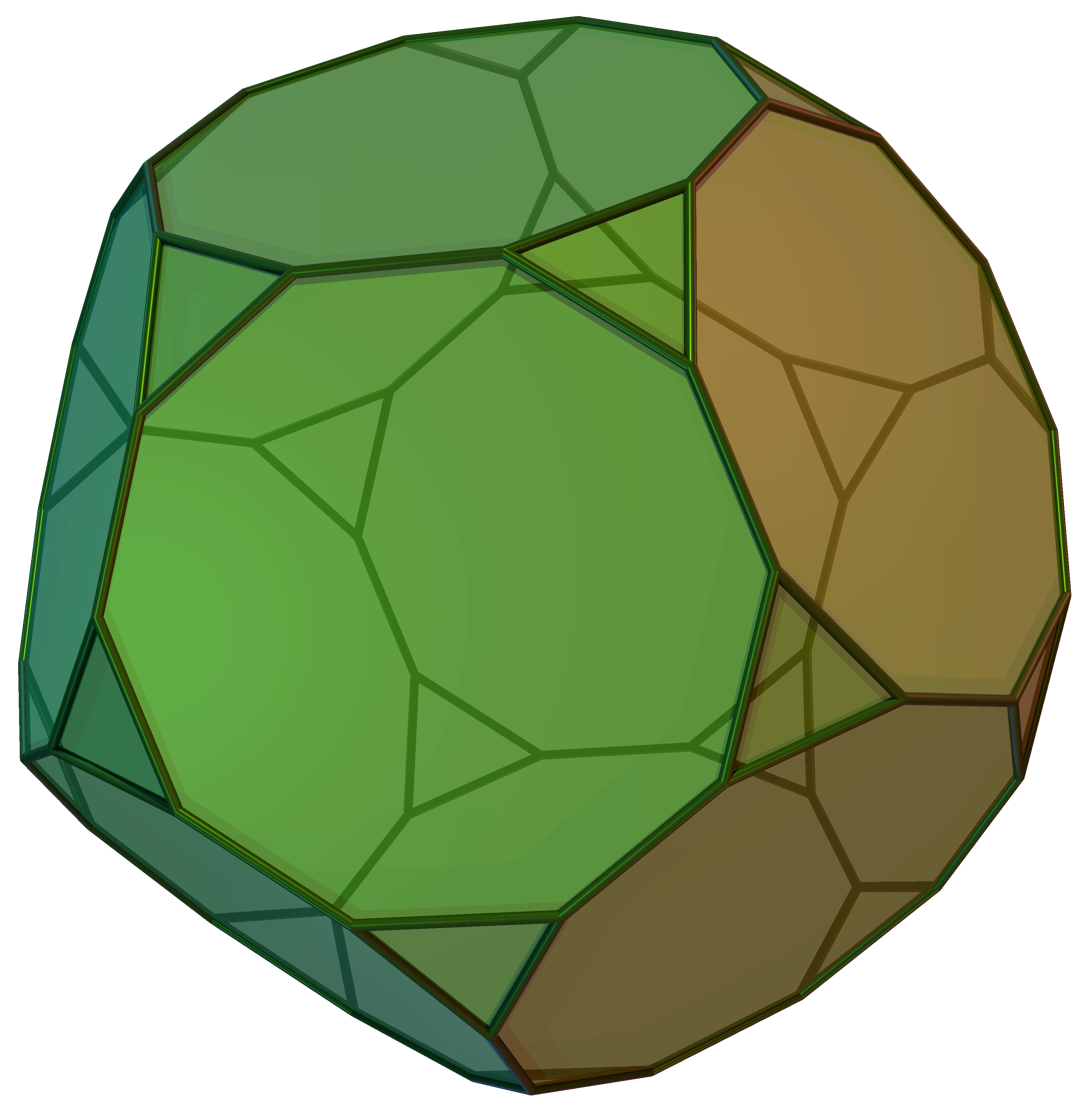
- Type: Archimedean solid
- Faces: 32
- Edges: 90
- Vertices: 60
- Symmetry group: icosahedral symmetry $\mathrm{I}_\mathrm{h}$
- Dihedral angle (degrees): 10-10: 116.57° 3-10: 142.62°
- Dual polyhedron: Triakis icosahedron

Vertex figure

Net

In geometry, the truncated dodecahedron is an Archimedean solid. It has 12 regular decagonal faces, 20 regular triangular faces, 60 vertices and 90 edges.

3D model of a truncated dodecahedron

== Construction ==
The truncated dodecahedron is constructed from a regular dodecahedron by cutting all of its vertices off, a process known as truncation. Alternatively, the truncated dodecahedron can be constructed by expansion: pushing away the edges of a regular dodecahedron, forming the pentagonal faces into decagonal faces, as well as the vertices into triangles. Therefore, it has 32 faces, 90 edges, and 60 vertices.

The truncated dodecahedron may also be constructed by using Cartesian coordinates. With an edge length $2\varphi - 2$ centered at the origin, they are all even permutations of
$$\left(0, \pm \frac{1}{\varphi}, \pm (2 + \varphi) \right), \qquad
\left(\pm \frac{1}{\varphi}, \pm \varphi, \pm 2 \varphi \right), \qquad
\left(\pm \varphi, \pm 2, \pm (\varphi + 1) \right),$$
where $\varphi = \frac{1 + \sqrt{5}}{2}$ is the golden ratio.

== Properties ==
The surface area $A$ and the volume $V$ of a truncated dodecahedron of edge length $a$ are:
$$\begin{align}
A &= 5 \left(\sqrt{3}+6\sqrt{5+2\sqrt{5}}\right) a^2 &&\approx 100.991a^2 \\
V &= \frac{5}{12} \left(99+47\sqrt{5}\right) a^3 &&\approx 85.040a^3
\end{align}$$

The dihedral angle of a truncated dodecahedron between two regular dodecahedral faces is 116.57°, and that between triangle-to-dodecahedron is 142.62°.

The truncated dodecahedron is an Archimedean solid, meaning it is a highly symmetric and semi-regular polyhedron, and two or more different regular polygonal faces meet in a vertex. It has the same symmetry as the regular icosahedron, the icosahedral symmetry. The polygonal faces that meet for every vertex are one equilateral triangle and two regular decagon, and the vertex figure of a truncated dodecahedron is $3 \cdot 10^2$. The dual of a truncated dodecahedron is triakis icosahedron, a Catalan solid, which shares the same symmetry as the truncated dodecahedron.

The truncated dodecahedron is non-chiral, meaning it is congruent to its mirror image.

== Truncated dodecahedral graph ==
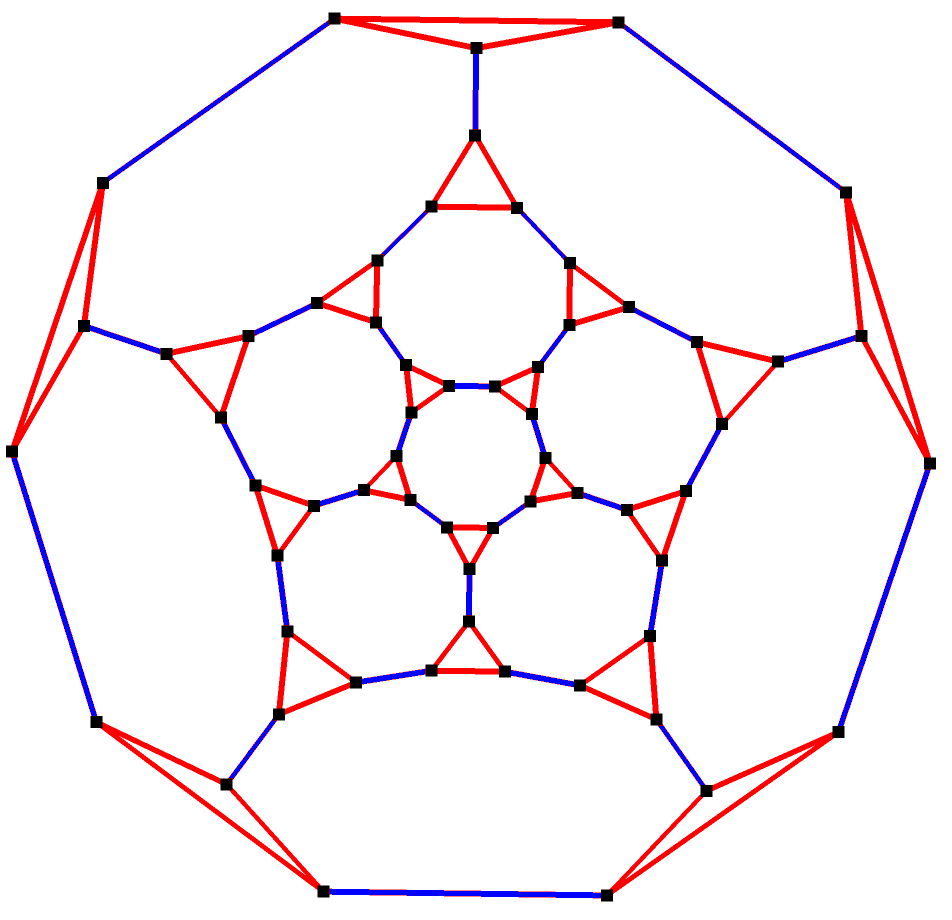
The graph of a truncated dodecahedron

In the mathematical field of graph theory, a truncated dodecahedral graph is the graph of vertices and edges of the truncated dodecahedron, one of the Archimedean solids. It has 60 vertices and 90 edges, and is a cubic Archimedean graph.

== Related polyhedron ==
The truncated dodecahedron can be applied in the polyhedron's construction known as the augmentation. Examples of polyhedrons are the Johnson solids, whose constructions are involved by attaching pentagonal cupolas onto the truncated dodecahedron: augmented truncated dodecahedron, parabiaugmented truncated dodecahedron, metabiaugmented truncated dodecahedron, and triaugmented truncated dodecahedron.

== See also ==
- Great stellated truncated dodecahedron
