= Icosahedral symmetry =

3D symmetry group

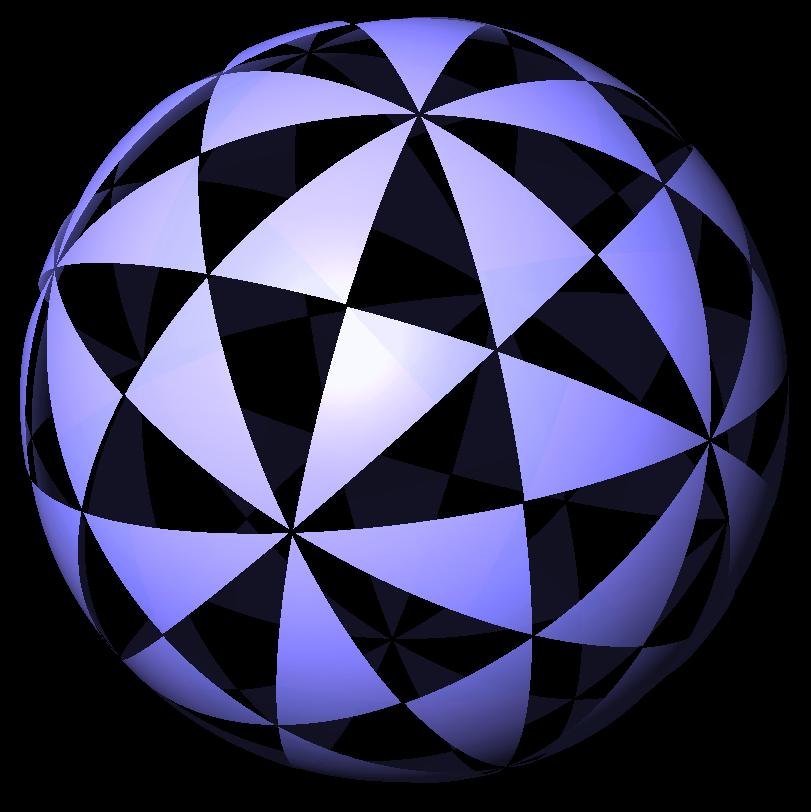
Icosahedral symmetry fundamental domains

A soccer ball, a common example of a spherical truncated icosahedron, has full icosahedral symmetry.

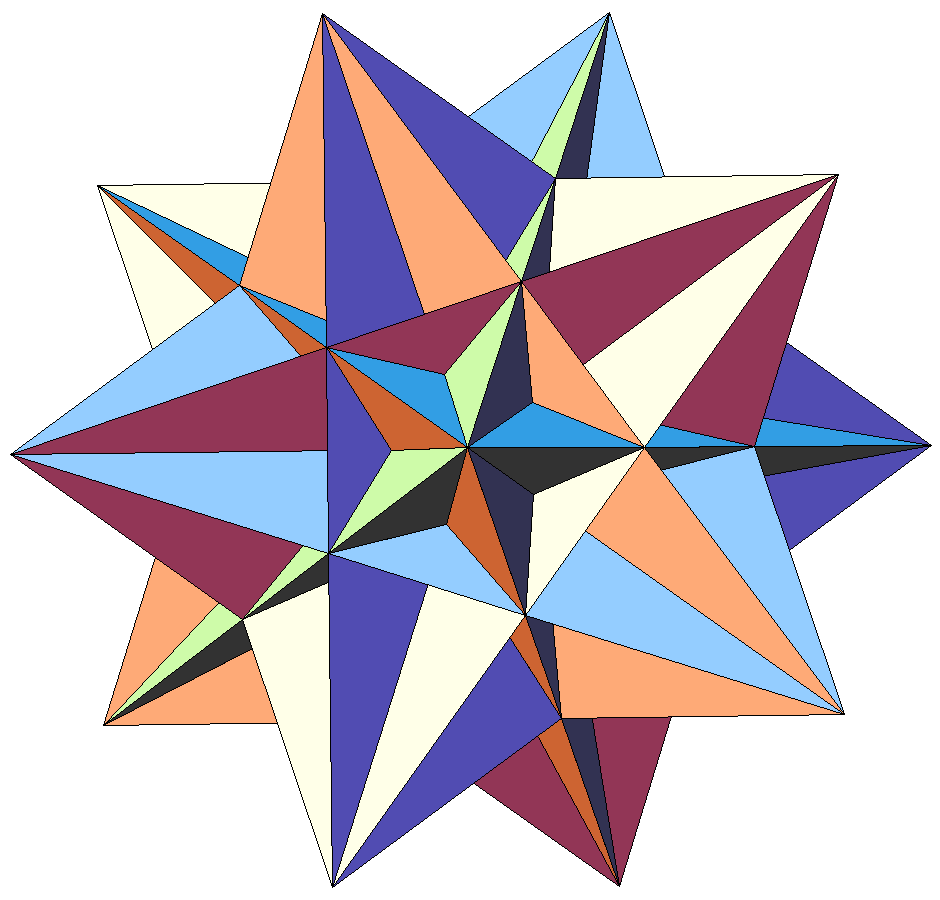
Rotations and reflections form the symmetry group of a great icosahedron.

In mathematics, and especially in geometry, an object has icosahedral symmetry if it has the same symmetries as a regular icosahedron or, equivalently, as its dual, the regular dodecahedron. These solids have 6 five-fold, 10 three-fold and 15 two-fold rotation axes, 15 mirror planes, and a center of inversion. The 60 rotations (including the identity) form the chiral icosahedral group I, which is isomorphic to the alternating group A_{5}. Together with the 60 orientation-reversing symmetries, they form the full icosahedral group I_{h} of order 120, which is isomorphic to A_{5} × Z_{2}.

Icosahedral symmetry is one of the three types of polyhedral symmetry among the point groups in three dimensions, besides tetrahedral symmetry and octahedral symmetry. It occurs, for instance, in the capsids of many viruses, in the buckminsterfullerene molecule, and in some quasicrystals.

== As point group ==
Apart from the two infinite series of prismatic and antiprismatic symmetry, rotational icosahedral symmetry or chiral icosahedral symmetry of chiral objects and full icosahedral symmetry or achiral icosahedral symmetry are the discrete point symmetries (or equivalently, symmetries on the sphere) with the largest symmetry groups.

Icosahedral symmetry is not compatible with translational symmetry, so there are no associated crystallographic point groups or space groups.

The full icosahedral group I_{h} is the Coxeter group of type H_{3}. It may be represented by Coxeter notation [5,3] and Coxeter diagram.

Schö.	Coxeter	Orb.	Abstract structure	Order
I	[5,3]^{+}	532	A_{5}	60
I_{h}	[5,3]	*532	A_{5} × Z_{2}	120

Presentations corresponding to the above are:

$$I: \langle s,t \mid s^2, t^3, (st)^5 \rangle$$
$I_h = \Delta(2,3,5):{}$$\langle a,b,c \mid a^2 = b^2 = c^2 = (ab)^5 = (bc)^3 = (ca)^2 = 1 \rangle.$

These correspond to the icosahedral groups (rotational and full) being the (2,3,5) triangle groups.

The first presentation was given by William Rowan Hamilton in 1856, in his paper on icosian calculus.

Note that other presentations are possible, for instance as an alternating group (for I).

=== Coxeter group generators ===
The full icosahedral symmetry group [5,3] of order 120 has generators represented by the reflection matrices R_{0}, R_{1}, R_{2} below, with relations R_{0}^{2} = R_{1}^{2} = R_{2}^{2} = (R_{0}×R_{1})^{5} = (R_{1}×R_{2})^{3} = (R_{0}×R_{2})^{2} = Identity. The group [5,3]^{+} of order 60 is generated by any two of the rotations S_{0,1}, S_{1,2}, S_{0,2}. A rotoreflection of order 10 is generated by V_{0,1,2}, the product of all 3 reflections. Here $\phi = \tfrac {\sqrt{5}+1} {2}$ denotes the golden ratio.

[5,3],
	Reflections			Rotations			Rotoreflection
Name	R_{0}	R_{1}	R_{2}	S_{0,1}	S_{1,2}	S_{0,2}	V_{0,1,2}
Group							
Order	2	2	2	5	3	2	10
Matrix	$\left[ \begin{smallmatrix} -1&0&0\\ 0&1&0\\ 0&0&1\end{smallmatrix} \right]$	$\left[ \begin{smallmatrix} {\frac {1-\phi}{2}}&{\frac {-\phi}{2}}&{\frac {-1}{2}}\\ {\frac {-\phi}{2}}&{\frac {1}{2}}&{\frac {1-\phi}{2}}\\ {\frac {-1}{2}}&{\frac {1-\phi}{2}}&{\frac {\phi}{2}}\end{smallmatrix} \right]$	$\left[ \begin{smallmatrix} 1&0&0\\ 0&-1&0\\ 0&0&1\end{smallmatrix} \right]$	$\left[ \begin{smallmatrix} {\frac {\phi-1}{2}}&{\frac {\phi}{2}}&{\frac {1}{2}}\\ {\frac {-\phi}{2}}&{\frac {1}{2}}&{\frac {1-\phi}{2}}\\ {\frac {-1}{2}}&{\frac {1-\phi}{2}}&{\frac {\phi}{2}}\end{smallmatrix} \right]$	$\left[ \begin{smallmatrix} {\frac {1-\phi}{2}}&{\frac {\phi}{2}}&{\frac {-1}{2}}\\ {\frac {-\phi}{2}}&{\frac {-1}{2}}&{\frac {1-\phi}{2}}\\ {\frac {-1}{2}}&{\frac {\phi-1}{2}}&{\frac {\phi}{2}}\end{smallmatrix} \right]$	$\left[ \begin{smallmatrix} -1&0&0\\ 0&-1&0\\ 0&0&1\end{smallmatrix} \right]$	$\left[ \begin{smallmatrix} {\frac {\phi-1}{2}}&{\frac {-\phi}{2}}&{\frac {1}{2}}\\ {\frac {-\phi}{2}}&{\frac {-1}{2}}&{\frac {1-\phi}{2}}\\ {\frac {-1}{2}}&{\frac {\phi-1}{2}}&{\frac {\phi}{2}}\end{smallmatrix} \right]$
	(1,0,0)_{n}	$( \begin{smallmatrix}\frac {\phi}{2}, \frac {1}{2}, \frac {\phi-1}{2}\end{smallmatrix} )$_{n}	(0,1,0)_{n}	$(0,-1,\phi)$_{axis}	$(1-\phi,0,\phi)$_{axis}	$(0,0,1)$_{axis}	

=== Visualizations ===
Schoe. (Orb.)	Coxeter notation	Elements	Mirror diagrams	
Schoe. (Orb.)	Coxeter notation	Elements	Orthogonal	Stereographic projection
I_{h} (*532)	[5,3]	Mirror lines: 15		
I (532)	[5,3]^{+}	Gyration points: 12_{5} 20_{3} 30_{2}		

== Group structure ==
Every polyhedron with icosahedral symmetry has 60 rotational (or orientation-preserving) symmetries and 60 orientation-reversing symmetries (that combine a rotation and a reflection), for a total symmetry order of 120.

The edges of a spherical compound of five octahedra represent the 15 mirror planes as colored great circles. Each octahedron can represent 3 orthogonal mirror planes by its edges.
The pyritohedral symmetry is an index 5 subgroup of icosahedral symmetry, with 3 orthogonal green reflection lines and 8 red order-3 gyration points. There are 5 different orientations of pyritohedral symmetry.

The icosahedral rotation group I is of order 60. The group I is isomorphic to A_{5}, the alternating group of even permutations of five objects. This isomorphism can be realized by I acting on various compounds, notably the compound of five cubes (which inscribe in the dodecahedron), the compound of five octahedra, or either of the two compounds of five tetrahedra (which are enantiomorphs, and inscribe in the dodecahedron). The group contains 5 versions of T, 10 versions of D_{3} (one per 3-fold axis), and 6 versions of D_{5}.

The full icosahedral group I_{h} has order 120. It has I as normal subgroup of index 2. The group I_{h} is isomorphic to I × Z_{2}, or A_{5} × Z_{2}, with the inversion in the center corresponding to element (identity,-1), where Z_{2} is written multiplicatively.

I_{h} acts on the compound of five cubes and the compound of five octahedra, but −1 acts as the identity (as cubes and octahedra are centrally symmetric). It acts on the compound of ten tetrahedra: I acts on the two chiral halves (compounds of five tetrahedra), and −1 interchanges the two halves. Notably, it does not act as S_{5}, and these groups are not isomorphic; see below for details.

The group contains 10 versions of D_{3d} and 6 versions of D_{5d} (symmetries like antiprisms).

=== Isomorphism of I with A_{5} ===
It is useful to describe explicitly what the isomorphism between I and A_{5} looks like. In the following table, permutations P_{i} and Q_{i} act on 5 and 12 elements respectively, while the rotation matrices M_{i} are the elements of I. If P_{k} is the product of taking the permutation P_{i} and applying P_{j} to it, then for the same values of i, j and k, it is also true that Q_{k} is the product of taking Q_{i} and applying Q_{j}, and also that premultiplying a vector by M_{k} is the same as premultiplying that vector by M_{i} and then premultiplying that result with M_{j}, that is M_{k} = M_{j} × M_{i}. Since the permutations P_{i} are all the 60 even permutations of 12345, the one-to-one correspondence is made explicit, therefore the isomorphism too.

Rotation matrix	Permutation of 5 on 1 2 3 4 5	Permutation of 12 on 1 2 3 4 5 6 7 8 9 10 11 12
$$M_{1}=\begin{bmatrix} 1&0&0\\ 0&1&0\\ 0&0&1\end{bmatrix}$$	$P_{1}$ = ()	$Q_{1}$ = ()
$$M_{2}=\begin{bmatrix} -\frac{1}{2}&\frac{1}{2\phi}&\frac{\phi}{2}\\ -\frac{1}{2\phi}&\frac{\phi}{2}&-\frac{1}{2}\\ -\frac{\phi}{2}&-\frac{1}{2}&-\frac{1}{2\phi}\end{bmatrix}$$	$P_{2}$ = (3 4 5)	$Q_{2}$ = (1 11 8)(2 9 6)(3 5 12)(4 7 10)
$$M_{3}=\begin{bmatrix} -\frac{1}{2}&-\frac{1}{2\phi}&-\frac{\phi}{2}\\ \frac{1}{2\phi}&\frac{\phi}{2}&-\frac{1}{2}\\ \frac{\phi}{2}&-\frac{1}{2}&-\frac{1}{2\phi}\end{bmatrix}$$	$P_{3}$ = (3 5 4)	$Q_{3}$ = (1 8 11)(2 6 9)(3 12 5)(4 10 7)
$$M_{4}=\begin{bmatrix} -\frac{1}{2}&\frac{1}{2\phi}&-\frac{\phi}{2}\\ \frac{1}{2\phi}&-\frac{\phi}{2}&-\frac{1}{2}\\ -\frac{\phi}{2}&-\frac{1}{2}&\frac{1}{2\phi}\end{bmatrix}$$	$P_{4}$ = (2 3)(4 5)	$Q_{4}$ = (1 12)(2 8)(3 6)(4 9)(5 10)(7 11)
$$M_{5}=\begin{bmatrix} \frac{\phi}{2}&\frac{1}{2}&\frac{1}{2\phi}\\ \frac{1}{2}&-\frac{1}{2\phi}&-\frac{\phi}{2}\\ -\frac{1}{2\phi}&\frac{\phi}{2}&-\frac{1}{2}\end{bmatrix}$$	$P_{5}$ = (2 3 4)	$Q_{5}$ = (1 2 3)(4 5 6)(7 9 8)(10 11 12)
$$M_{6}=\begin{bmatrix} -\frac{1}{2\phi}&-\frac{\phi}{2}&\frac{1}{2}\\ \frac{\phi}{2}&-\frac{1}{2}&-\frac{1}{2\phi}\\ \frac{1}{2}&\frac{1}{2\phi}&\frac{\phi}{2}\end{bmatrix}$$	$P_{6}$ = (2 3 5)	$Q_{6}$ = (1 7 5)(2 4 11)(3 10 9)(6 8 12)
$$M_{7}=\begin{bmatrix} \frac{\phi}{2}&\frac{1}{2}&-\frac{1}{2\phi}\\ \frac{1}{2}&-\frac{1}{2\phi}&\frac{\phi}{2}\\ \frac{1}{2\phi}&-\frac{\phi}{2}&-\frac{1}{2}\end{bmatrix}$$	$P_{7}$ = (2 4 3)	$Q_{7}$ = (1 3 2)(4 6 5)(7 8 9)(10 12 11)
$$M_{8}=\begin{bmatrix} 0&-1&0\\ 0&0&1\\ -1&0&0\end{bmatrix}$$	$P_{8}$ = (2 4 5)	$Q_{8}$ = (1 10 6)(2 7 12)(3 4 8)(5 11 9)
$$M_{9}=\begin{bmatrix} -\frac{\phi}{2}&\frac{1}{2}&\frac{1}{2\phi}\\ \frac{1}{2}&\frac{1}{2\phi}&\frac{\phi}{2}\\ \frac{1}{2\phi}&\frac{\phi}{2}&-\frac{1}{2}\end{bmatrix}$$	$P_{9}$ = (2 4)(3 5)	$Q_{9}$ = (1 9)(2 5)(3 11)(4 12)(6 7)(8 10)
$$M_{10}=\begin{bmatrix} -\frac{1}{2\phi}&\frac{\phi}{2}&\frac{1}{2}\\ -\frac{\phi}{2}&-\frac{1}{2}&\frac{1}{2\phi}\\ \frac{1}{2}&-\frac{1}{2\phi}&\frac{\phi}{2}\end{bmatrix}$$	$P_{10}$ = (2 5 3)	$Q_{10}$ = (1 5 7)(2 11 4)(3 9 10)(6 12 8)
$$M_{11}=\begin{bmatrix} 0&0&-1\\ -1&0&0\\ 0&1&0\end{bmatrix}$$	$P_{11}$ = (2 5 4)	$Q_{11}$ = (1 6 10)(2 12 7)(3 8 4)(5 9 11)
$$M_{12}=\begin{bmatrix} \frac{1}{2\phi}&-\frac{\phi}{2}&\frac{1}{2}\\ -\frac{\phi}{2}&-\frac{1}{2}&-\frac{1}{2\phi}\\ \frac{1}{2}&-\frac{1}{2\phi}&-\frac{\phi}{2}\end{bmatrix}$$	$P_{12}$ = (2 5)(3 4)	$Q_{12}$ = (1 4)(2 10)(3 7)(5 8)(6 11)(9 12)
$$M_{13}=\begin{bmatrix} 1&0&0\\ 0&-1&0\\ 0&0&-1\end{bmatrix}$$	$P_{13}$ = (1 2)(4 5)	$Q_{13}$ = (1 3)(2 4)(5 8)(6 7)(9 10)(11 12)
$$M_{14}=\begin{bmatrix} -\frac{1}{2}&\frac{1}{2\phi}&\frac{\phi}{2}\\ \frac{1}{2\phi}&-\frac{\phi}{2}&\frac{1}{2}\\ \frac{\phi}{2}&\frac{1}{2}&\frac{1}{2\phi}\end{bmatrix}$$	$P_{14}$ = (1 2)(3 4)	$Q_{14}$ = (1 5)(2 7)(3 11)(4 9)(6 10)(8 12)
$$M_{15}=\begin{bmatrix} -\frac{1}{2}&-\frac{1}{2\phi}&-\frac{\phi}{2}\\ -\frac{1}{2\phi}&-\frac{\phi}{2}&\frac{1}{2}\\ -\frac{\phi}{2}&\frac{1}{2}&\frac{1}{2\phi}\end{bmatrix}$$	$P_{15}$ = (1 2)(3 5)	$Q_{15}$ = (1 12)(2 10)(3 8)(4 6)(5 11)(7 9)
$$M_{16}=\begin{bmatrix} -\frac{1}{2}&-\frac{1}{2\phi}&\frac{\phi}{2}\\ \frac{1}{2\phi}&\frac{\phi}{2}&\frac{1}{2}\\ -\frac{\phi}{2}&\frac{1}{2}&-\frac{1}{2\phi}\end{bmatrix}$$	$P_{16}$ = (1 2 3)	$Q_{16}$ = (1 11 6)(2 5 9)(3 7 12)(4 10 8)
$$M_{17}=\begin{bmatrix} -\frac{1}{2\phi}&\frac{\phi}{2}&-\frac{1}{2}\\ \frac{\phi}{2}&\frac{1}{2}&\frac{1}{2\phi}\\ \frac{1}{2}&-\frac{1}{2\phi}&-\frac{\phi}{2}\end{bmatrix}$$	$P_{17}$ = (1 2 3 4 5)	$Q_{17}$ = (1 6 5 3 9)(4 12 7 8 11)
$$M_{18}=\begin{bmatrix} \frac{\phi}{2}&-\frac{1}{2}&-\frac{1}{2\phi}\\ \frac{1}{2}&\frac{1}{2\phi}&\frac{\phi}{2}\\ -\frac{1}{2\phi}&-\frac{\phi}{2}&\frac{1}{2}\end{bmatrix}$$	$P_{18}$ = (1 2 3 5 4)	$Q_{18}$ = (1 4 8 6 2)(5 7 10 12 9)
$$M_{19}=\begin{bmatrix} -\frac{1}{2\phi}&-\frac{\phi}{2}&-\frac{1}{2}\\ -\frac{\phi}{2}&\frac{1}{2}&-\frac{1}{2\phi}\\ \frac{1}{2}&\frac{1}{2\phi}&-\frac{\phi}{2}\end{bmatrix}$$	$P_{19}$ = (1 2 4 5 3)	$Q_{19}$ = (1 8 7 3 10)(2 12 5 6 11)
$$M_{20}=\begin{bmatrix} 0&0&1\\ -1&0&0\\ 0&-1&0\end{bmatrix}$$	$P_{20}$ = (1 2 4)	$Q_{20}$ = (1 7 4)(2 11 8)(3 5 10)(6 9 12)
$$M_{21}=\begin{bmatrix} \frac{1}{2\phi}&\frac{\phi}{2}&-\frac{1}{2}\\ -\frac{\phi}{2}&\frac{1}{2}&\frac{1}{2\phi}\\ \frac{1}{2}&\frac{1}{2\phi}&\frac{\phi}{2}\end{bmatrix}$$	$P_{21}$ = (1 2 4 3 5)	$Q_{21}$ = (1 2 9 11 7)(3 6 12 10 4)
$$M_{22}=\begin{bmatrix} \frac{\phi}{2}&-\frac{1}{2}&\frac{1}{2\phi}\\ \frac{1}{2}&\frac{1}{2\phi}&-\frac{\phi}{2}\\ \frac{1}{2\phi}&\frac{\phi}{2}&\frac{1}{2}\end{bmatrix}$$	$P_{22}$ = (1 2 5 4 3)	$Q_{22}$ = (2 3 4 7 5)(6 8 10 11 9)
$$M_{23}=\begin{bmatrix} 0&1&0\\ 0&0&-1\\ -1&0&0\end{bmatrix}$$	$P_{23}$ = (1 2 5)	$Q_{23}$ = (1 9 8)(2 6 3)(4 5 12)(7 11 10)
$$M_{24}=\begin{bmatrix} -\frac{\phi}{2}&-\frac{1}{2}&-\frac{1}{2\phi}\\ \frac{1}{2}&-\frac{1}{2\phi}&-\frac{\phi}{2}\\ \frac{1}{2\phi}&-\frac{\phi}{2}&\frac{1}{2}\end{bmatrix}$$	$P_{24}$ = (1 2 5 3 4)	$Q_{24}$ = (1 10 5 4 11)(2 8 9 3 12)
$$M_{25}=\begin{bmatrix} -\frac{1}{2}&\frac{1}{2\phi}&-\frac{\phi}{2}\\ -\frac{1}{2\phi}&\frac{\phi}{2}&\frac{1}{2}\\ \frac{\phi}{2}&\frac{1}{2}&-\frac{1}{2\phi}\end{bmatrix}$$	$P_{25}$ = (1 3 2)	$Q_{25}$ = (1 6 11)(2 9 5)(3 12 7)(4 8 10)
$$M_{26}=\begin{bmatrix} \frac{\phi}{2}&\frac{1}{2}&\frac{1}{2\phi}\\ -\frac{1}{2}&\frac{1}{2\phi}&\frac{\phi}{2}\\ \frac{1}{2\phi}&-\frac{\phi}{2}&\frac{1}{2}\end{bmatrix}$$	$P_{26}$ = (1 3 4 5 2)	$Q_{26}$ = (2 5 7 4 3)(6 9 11 10 8)
$$M_{27}=\begin{bmatrix} -\frac{1}{2\phi}&-\frac{\phi}{2}&\frac{1}{2}\\ -\frac{\phi}{2}&\frac{1}{2}&\frac{1}{2\phi}\\ -\frac{1}{2}&-\frac{1}{2\phi}&-\frac{\phi}{2}\end{bmatrix}$$	$P_{27}$ = (1 3 5 4 2)	$Q_{27}$ = (1 10 3 7 8)(2 11 6 5 12)
$$M_{28}=\begin{bmatrix} -\frac{1}{2}&-\frac{1}{2\phi}&\frac{\phi}{2}\\ -\frac{1}{2\phi}&-\frac{\phi}{2}&-\frac{1}{2}\\ \frac{\phi}{2}&-\frac{1}{2}&\frac{1}{2\phi}\end{bmatrix}$$	$P_{28}$ = (1 3)(4 5)	$Q_{28}$ = (1 7)(2 10)(3 11)(4 5)(6 12)(8 9)
$$M_{29}=\begin{bmatrix} -\frac{1}{2\phi}&\frac{\phi}{2}&-\frac{1}{2}\\ -\frac{\phi}{2}&-\frac{1}{2}&-\frac{1}{2\phi}\\ -\frac{1}{2}&\frac{1}{2\phi}&\frac{\phi}{2}\end{bmatrix}$$	$P_{29}$ = (1 3 4)	$Q_{29}$ = (1 9 10)(2 12 4)(3 6 8)(5 11 7)
$$M_{30}=\begin{bmatrix} \frac{\phi}{2}&-\frac{1}{2}&-\frac{1}{2\phi}\\ -\frac{1}{2}&-\frac{1}{2\phi}&-\frac{\phi}{2}\\ \frac{1}{2\phi}&\frac{\phi}{2}&-\frac{1}{2}\end{bmatrix}$$	$P_{30}$ = (1 3 5)	$Q_{30}$ = (1 3 4)(2 8 7)(5 6 10)(9 12 11)
$$M_{31}=\begin{bmatrix} -\frac{\phi}{2}&\frac{1}{2}&-\frac{1}{2\phi}\\ \frac{1}{2}&\frac{1}{2\phi}&-\frac{\phi}{2}\\ -\frac{1}{2\phi}&-\frac{\phi}{2}&-\frac{1}{2}\end{bmatrix}$$	$P_{31}$ = (1 3)(2 4)	$Q_{31}$ = (1 12)(2 6)(3 9)(4 11)(5 8)(7 10)
$$M_{32}=\begin{bmatrix} \frac{1}{2\phi}&-\frac{\phi}{2}&-\frac{1}{2}\\ \frac{\phi}{2}&\frac{1}{2}&-\frac{1}{2\phi}\\ \frac{1}{2}&-\frac{1}{2\phi}&\frac{\phi}{2}\end{bmatrix}$$	$P_{32}$ = (1 3 2 4 5)	$Q_{32}$ = (1 4 10 11 5)(2 3 8 12 9)
$$M_{33}=\begin{bmatrix} \frac{1}{2}&\frac{1}{2\phi}&\frac{\phi}{2}\\ \frac{1}{2\phi}&\frac{\phi}{2}&-\frac{1}{2}\\ -\frac{\phi}{2}&\frac{1}{2}&\frac{1}{2\phi}\end{bmatrix}$$	$P_{33}$ = (1 3 5 2 4)	$Q_{33}$ = (1 5 9 6 3)(4 7 11 12 8)
$$M_{34}=\begin{bmatrix} \frac{1}{2\phi}&\frac{\phi}{2}&\frac{1}{2}\\ \frac{\phi}{2}&-\frac{1}{2}&\frac{1}{2\phi}\\ \frac{1}{2}&\frac{1}{2\phi}&-\frac{\phi}{2}\end{bmatrix}$$	$P_{34}$ = (1 3)(2 5)	$Q_{34}$ = (1 2)(3 5)(4 9)(6 7)(8 11)(10 12)
$$M_{35}=\begin{bmatrix} -\frac{\phi}{2}&-\frac{1}{2}&\frac{1}{2\phi}\\ \frac{1}{2}&-\frac{1}{2\phi}&\frac{\phi}{2}\\ -\frac{1}{2\phi}&\frac{\phi}{2}&\frac{1}{2}\end{bmatrix}$$	$P_{35}$ = (1 3 2 5 4)	$Q_{35}$ = (1 11 2 7 9)(3 10 6 4 12)
$$M_{36}=\begin{bmatrix} \frac{1}{2}&-\frac{1}{2\phi}&-\frac{\phi}{2}\\ \frac{1}{2\phi}&-\frac{\phi}{2}&\frac{1}{2}\\ -\frac{\phi}{2}&-\frac{1}{2}&-\frac{1}{2\phi}\end{bmatrix}$$	$P_{36}$ = (1 3 4 2 5)	$Q_{36}$ = (1 8 2 4 6)(5 10 9 7 12)
$$M_{37}=\begin{bmatrix} \frac{\phi}{2}&\frac{1}{2}&-\frac{1}{2\phi}\\ -\frac{1}{2}&\frac{1}{2\phi}&-\frac{\phi}{2}\\ -\frac{1}{2\phi}&\frac{\phi}{2}&\frac{1}{2}\end{bmatrix}$$	$P_{37}$ = (1 4 5 3 2)	$Q_{37}$ = (1 2 6 8 4)(5 9 12 10 7)
$$M_{38}=\begin{bmatrix} 0&-1&0\\ 0&0&-1\\ 1&0&0\end{bmatrix}$$	$P_{38}$ = (1 4 2)	$Q_{38}$ = (1 4 7)(2 8 11)(3 10 5)(6 12 9)
$$M_{39}=\begin{bmatrix} -\frac{\phi}{2}&\frac{1}{2}&\frac{1}{2\phi}\\ -\frac{1}{2}&-\frac{1}{2\phi}&-\frac{\phi}{2}\\ -\frac{1}{2\phi}&-\frac{\phi}{2}&\frac{1}{2}\end{bmatrix}$$	$P_{39}$ = (1 4 3 5 2)	$Q_{39}$ = (1 11 4 5 10)(2 12 3 9 8)
$$M_{40}=\begin{bmatrix} -\frac{1}{2\phi}&-\frac{\phi}{2}&-\frac{1}{2}\\ \frac{\phi}{2}&-\frac{1}{2}&\frac{1}{2\phi}\\ -\frac{1}{2}&-\frac{1}{2\phi}&\frac{\phi}{2}\end{bmatrix}$$	$P_{40}$ = (1 4 3)	$Q_{40}$ = (1 10 9)(2 4 12)(3 8 6)(5 7 11)
$$M_{41}=\begin{bmatrix} 0&0&1\\ 1&0&0\\ 0&1&0\end{bmatrix}$$	$P_{41}$ = (1 4 5)	$Q_{41}$ = (1 5 2)(3 7 9)(4 11 6)(8 10 12)
$$M_{42}=\begin{bmatrix} \frac{1}{2\phi}&\frac{\phi}{2}&-\frac{1}{2}\\ \frac{\phi}{2}&-\frac{1}{2}&-\frac{1}{2\phi}\\ -\frac{1}{2}&-\frac{1}{2\phi}&-\frac{\phi}{2}\end{bmatrix}$$	$P_{42}$ = (1 4)(3 5)	$Q_{42}$ = (1 6)(2 3)(4 9)(5 8)(7 12)(10 11)
$$M_{43}=\begin{bmatrix} -\frac{\phi}{2}&\frac{1}{2}&-\frac{1}{2\phi}\\ -\frac{1}{2}&-\frac{1}{2\phi}&\frac{\phi}{2}\\ \frac{1}{2\phi}&\frac{\phi}{2}&\frac{1}{2}\end{bmatrix}$$	$P_{43}$ = (1 4 5 2 3)	$Q_{43}$ = (1 9 7 2 11)(3 12 4 6 10)
$$M_{44}=\begin{bmatrix} \frac{1}{2\phi}&-\frac{\phi}{2}&-\frac{1}{2}\\ -\frac{\phi}{2}&-\frac{1}{2}&\frac{1}{2\phi}\\ -\frac{1}{2}&\frac{1}{2\phi}&-\frac{\phi}{2}\end{bmatrix}$$	$P_{44}$ = (1 4)(2 3)	$Q_{44}$ = (1 8)(2 10)(3 4)(5 12)(6 7)(9 11)
$$M_{45}=\begin{bmatrix} \frac{1}{2}&\frac{1}{2\phi}&\frac{\phi}{2}\\ -\frac{1}{2\phi}&-\frac{\phi}{2}&\frac{1}{2}\\ \frac{\phi}{2}&-\frac{1}{2}&-\frac{1}{2\phi}\end{bmatrix}$$	$P_{45}$ = (1 4 2 3 5)	$Q_{45}$ = (2 7 3 5 4)(6 11 8 9 10)
$$M_{46}=\begin{bmatrix} \frac{1}{2}&\frac{1}{2\phi}&-\frac{\phi}{2}\\ \frac{1}{2\phi}&\frac{\phi}{2}&\frac{1}{2}\\ \frac{\phi}{2}&-\frac{1}{2}&\frac{1}{2\phi}\end{bmatrix}$$	$P_{46}$ = (1 4 2 5 3)	$Q_{46}$ = (1 3 6 9 5)(4 8 12 11 7)
$$M_{47}=\begin{bmatrix} \frac{1}{2}&-\frac{1}{2\phi}&\frac{\phi}{2}\\ -\frac{1}{2\phi}&\frac{\phi}{2}&\frac{1}{2}\\ -\frac{\phi}{2}&-\frac{1}{2}&\frac{1}{2\phi}\end{bmatrix}$$	$P_{47}$ = (1 4 3 2 5)	$Q_{47}$ = (1 7 10 8 3)(2 5 11 12 6)
$$M_{48}=\begin{bmatrix} -1&0&0\\ 0&1&0\\ 0&0&-1\end{bmatrix}$$	$P_{48}$ = (1 4)(2 5)	$Q_{48}$ = (1 12)(2 9)(3 11)(4 10)(5 6)(7 8)
$$M_{49}=\begin{bmatrix} -\frac{1}{2\phi}&\frac{\phi}{2}&\frac{1}{2}\\ \frac{\phi}{2}&\frac{1}{2}&-\frac{1}{2\phi}\\ -\frac{1}{2}&\frac{1}{2\phi}&-\frac{\phi}{2}\end{bmatrix}$$	$P_{49}$ = (1 5 4 3 2)	$Q_{49}$ = (1 9 3 5 6)(4 11 8 7 12)
$$M_{50}=\begin{bmatrix} 0&0&-1\\ 1&0&0\\ 0&-1&0\end{bmatrix}$$	$P_{50}$ = (1 5 2)	$Q_{50}$ = (1 8 9)(2 3 6)(4 12 5)(7 10 11)
$$M_{51}=\begin{bmatrix} \frac{1}{2\phi}&-\frac{\phi}{2}&\frac{1}{2}\\ \frac{\phi}{2}&\frac{1}{2}&\frac{1}{2\phi}\\ -\frac{1}{2}&\frac{1}{2\phi}&\frac{\phi}{2}\end{bmatrix}$$	$P_{51}$ = (1 5 3 4 2)	$Q_{51}$ = (1 7 11 9 2)(3 4 10 12 6)
$$M_{52}=\begin{bmatrix} \frac{\phi}{2}&-\frac{1}{2}&\frac{1}{2\phi}\\ -\frac{1}{2}&-\frac{1}{2\phi}&\frac{\phi}{2}\\ -\frac{1}{2\phi}&-\frac{\phi}{2}&-\frac{1}{2}\end{bmatrix}$$	$P_{52}$ = (1 5 3)	$Q_{52}$ = (1 4 3)(2 7 8)(5 10 6)(9 11 12)
$$M_{53}=\begin{bmatrix} 0&1&0\\ 0&0&1\\ 1&0&0\end{bmatrix}$$	$P_{53}$ = (1 5 4)	$Q_{53}$ = (1 2 5)(3 9 7)(4 6 11)(8 12 10)
$$M_{54}=\begin{bmatrix} -\frac{\phi}{2}&-\frac{1}{2}&-\frac{1}{2\phi}\\ -\frac{1}{2}&\frac{1}{2\phi}&\frac{\phi}{2}\\ -\frac{1}{2\phi}&\frac{\phi}{2}&-\frac{1}{2}\end{bmatrix}$$	$P_{54}$ = (1 5)(3 4)	$Q_{54}$ = (1 12)(2 11)(3 10)(4 8)(5 9)(6 7)
$$M_{55}=\begin{bmatrix} \frac{1}{2\phi}&\frac{\phi}{2}&\frac{1}{2}\\ -\frac{\phi}{2}&\frac{1}{2}&-\frac{1}{2\phi}\\ -\frac{1}{2}&-\frac{1}{2\phi}&\frac{\phi}{2}\end{bmatrix}$$	$P_{55}$ = (1 5 4 2 3)	$Q_{55}$ = (1 5 11 10 4)(2 9 12 8 3)
$$M_{56}=\begin{bmatrix} -\frac{\phi}{2}&-\frac{1}{2}&\frac{1}{2\phi}\\ -\frac{1}{2}&\frac{1}{2\phi}&-\frac{\phi}{2}\\ \frac{1}{2\phi}&-\frac{\phi}{2}&-\frac{1}{2}\end{bmatrix}$$	$P_{56}$ = (1 5)(2 3)	$Q_{56}$ = (1 10)(2 12)(3 11)(4 7)(5 8)(6 9)
$$M_{57}=\begin{bmatrix} \frac{1}{2}&-\frac{1}{2\phi}&-\frac{\phi}{2}\\ -\frac{1}{2\phi}&\frac{\phi}{2}&-\frac{1}{2}\\ \frac{\phi}{2}&\frac{1}{2}&\frac{1}{2\phi}\end{bmatrix}$$	$P_{57}$ = (1 5 2 3 4)	$Q_{57}$ = (1 3 8 10 7)(2 6 12 11 5)
$$M_{58}=\begin{bmatrix} \frac{1}{2}&\frac{1}{2\phi}&-\frac{\phi}{2}\\ -\frac{1}{2\phi}&-\frac{\phi}{2}&-\frac{1}{2}\\ -\frac{\phi}{2}&\frac{1}{2}&-\frac{1}{2\phi}\end{bmatrix}$$	$P_{58}$ = (1 5 2 4 3)	$Q_{58}$ = (1 6 4 2 8)(5 12 7 9 10)
$$M_{59}=\begin{bmatrix} \frac{1}{2}&-\frac{1}{2\phi}&\frac{\phi}{2}\\ \frac{1}{2\phi}&-\frac{\phi}{2}&-\frac{1}{2}\\ \frac{\phi}{2}&\frac{1}{2}&-\frac{1}{2\phi}\end{bmatrix}$$	$P_{59}$ = (1 5 3 2 4)	$Q_{59}$ = (2 4 5 3 7)(6 10 9 8 11)
$$M_{60}=\begin{bmatrix} -1&0&0\\ 0&-1&0\\ 0&0&1\end{bmatrix}$$	$P_{60}$ = (1 5)(2 4)	$Q_{60}$ = (1 11)(2 10)(3 12)(4 9)(5 7)(6 8)

This non-abelian simple group is the only non-trivial normal subgroup of the symmetric group on five letters. Since the Galois group of the general quintic equation is isomorphic to the symmetric group on five letters, and this normal subgroup is simple and non-abelian, the general quintic equation does not have a solution in radicals. The proof of the Abel–Ruffini theorem uses this simple fact, and Felix Klein wrote a book that made use of the theory of icosahedral symmetries to derive an analytical solution to the general quintic equation. A modern exposition is given in Tóth (2002).

=== Commonly confused groups ===
The following groups all have order 120, but are not isomorphic:

- S_{5}, the symmetric group on 5 elements
- I_{h}, the full icosahedral group (subject of this article, also known as H_{3})
- 2I, the binary icosahedral group, one of the binary polyhedral groups

They correspond to the following short exact sequences (the latter of which does not split) and product

$$1\to A_5 \to S_5 \to Z_2 \to 1$$
$$I_h = A_5 \times Z_2$$
$$1\to Z_2 \to 2I\to A_5 \to 1$$

In words,

- $A_5$ is a normal subgroup of $S_5$
- $A_5$ is a factor of $I_h$, which is a direct product
- $A_5$ is a quotient group of $2I$

Note that $A_5$ has an exceptional irreducible 3-dimensional representation (as the icosahedral rotation group), but $S_5$ does not have an irreducible 3-dimensional representation, corresponding to the full icosahedral group not being the symmetric group.

These can also be related to linear groups over the finite field with five elements, which exhibit the subgroups and covering groups directly; none of these are the full icosahedral group:

- $A_5 \cong \operatorname{PSL}(2,5),$ the projective special linear group (for a proof, see Projective linear group § Action on p points);
- $S_5 \cong \operatorname{PGL}(2,5),$ the projective general linear group;
- $2I \cong \operatorname{SL}(2,5),$ the special linear group.

=== Conjugacy classes ===
The 120 symmetries fall into 10 conjugacy classes.

Conjugacy classes
I	Additional classes of I_{h}
identity, order 1; 12 × rotation by ±72°, order 5, around the 6 axes through the face centers of the dodecahedron; 12 × rotation by ±144°, order 5, around the 6 axes through the face centers of the dodecahedron; 20 × rotation by ±120°, order 3, around the 10 axes through vertices of the dodecahedron; 15 × rotation by 180°, order 2, around the 15 axes through midpoints of edges of the dodecahedron	central inversion, order 2; 12 × rotoreflection by ±36°, order 10, around the 6 axes through the face centers of the dodecahedron; 12 × rotoreflection by ±108°, order 10, around the 6 axes through the face centers of the dodecahedron; 20 × rotoreflection by ±60°, order 6, around the 10 axes through the vertices of the dodecahedron; 15 × reflection, order 2, at 15 planes through edges of the dodecahedron

=== Subgroups of the full icosahedral symmetry group ===
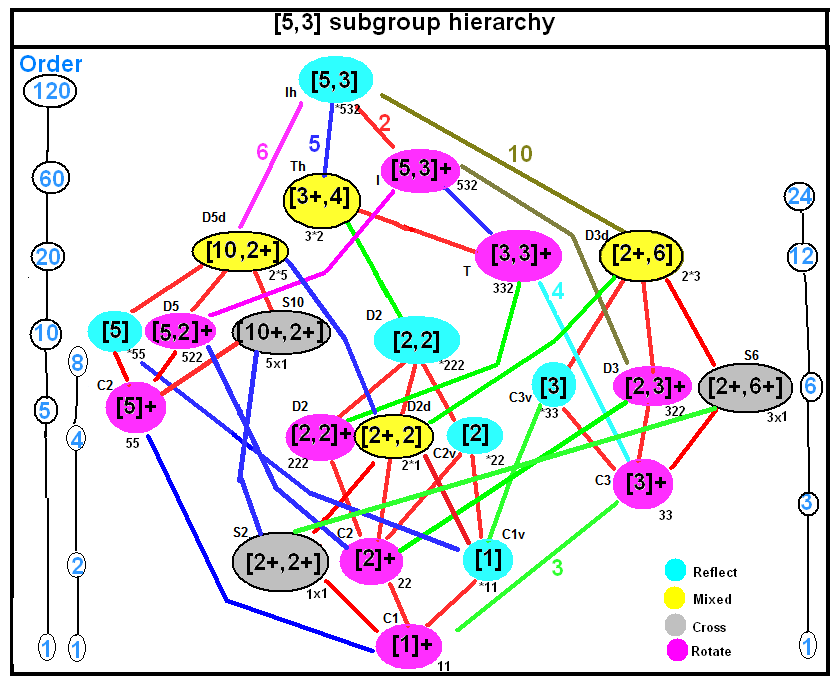
Subgroup relations

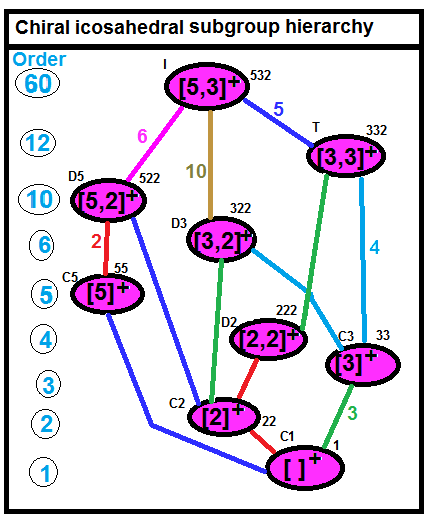
Chiral subgroup relations

Each line in the following table represents one class of conjugate (i.e., geometrically equivalent) subgroups. The column "Mult." (multiplicity) gives the number of different subgroups in the conjugacy class.

Explanation of colors: cyan = the groups that are generated by reflections; yellow = other groups that contain reflections; grey = groups that contain improper rotations but no reflections; pink = the chiral (orientation-preserving) groups, which contain only rotations.

The groups are described geometrically in terms of the dodecahedron.

The abbreviation "h.t.s.(edge)" means "halfturn swapping this edge with its opposite edge", and similarly for "face" and "vertex".

Schön.	Coxeter	Orb.	H-M	Structure	Cyc.	Order	Index	Mult.	Description
I_{h}	[5,3]	*532	5̅3̅2/m	A_{5}×Z_{2}		120	1	1	full group
D_{2h}	[2,2]	*222	mmm	D_{4}×D_{2}=D_{2}^{3}		8	15	5	fixing two opposite edges, possibly swapping them
C_{5v}	[5]	*55	5m	D_{10}		10	12	6	fixing a face
C_{3v}	[3]	*33	3m	D_{6}=S_{3}		6	20	10	fixing a vertex
C_{2v}	[2]	*22	2mm	D_{4}=D_{2}^{2}		4	30	15	fixing an edge
C_{s}	[ ]	*	2̅ or m	D_{2}		2	60	15	reflection swapping two endpoints of an edge
T_{h}	[3^{+},4]	3*2	m3̅	A_{4}×Z_{2}		24	5	5	pyritohedral group
D_{5d}	[2^{+},10]	2*5	5̅m	D_{20}=Z_{2}×D_{10}		20	6	6	fixing two opposite faces, possibly swapping them
D_{3d}	[2^{+},6]	2*3	3̅m	D_{12}=Z_{2}×D_{6}		12	10	10	fixing two opposite vertices, possibly swapping them
D_{1d} = C_{2h}	[2^{+},2]	2*	2/m	D_{4}=Z_{2}×D_{2}		4	30	15	halfturn around edge midpoint, plus central inversion
S_{10}	[2^{+},10^{+}]	5×	5̅	Z_{10}=Z_{2}×Z_{5}		10	12	6	rotations of a face, plus central inversion
S_{6}	[2^{+},6^{+}]	3×	3̅	Z_{6}=Z_{2}×Z_{3}		6	20	10	rotations about a vertex, plus central inversion
S_{2}	[2^{+},2^{+}]	×	1̅	Z_{2}		2	60	1	central inversion
I	[5,3]^{+}	532	532	A_{5}		60	2	1	all rotations
T	[3,3]^{+}	332	332	A_{4}		12	10	5	rotations of a contained tetrahedron
D_{5}	[2,5]^{+}	522	522	D_{10}		10	12	6	rotations around the center of a face, and h.t.s.(face)
D_{3}	[2,3]^{+}	322	322	D_{6}=S_{3}		6	20	10	rotations around a vertex, and h.t.s.(vertex)
D_{2}	[2,2]^{+}	222	222	D_{4}=Z_{2}^{2}		4	30	5	halfturn around edge midpoint, and h.t.s.(edge)
C_{5}	[5]^{+}	55	5	Z_{5}		5	24	6	rotations around a face center
C_{3}	[3]^{+}	33	3	Z_{3}=A_{3}		3	40	10	rotations around a vertex
C_{2}	[2]^{+}	22	2	Z_{2}		2	60	15	half-turn around edge midpoint
C_{1}	[ ]^{+}	11	1	Z_{1}		1	120	1	trivial group

==== Vertex stabilizers ====
Stabilizers of an opposite pair of vertices can be interpreted as stabilizers of the axis they generate.

- vertex stabilizers in I give cyclic groups C_{3}
- vertex stabilizers in I_{h} give groups C_{3v}, isomorphic to the dihedral group Dih_{3}
- stabilizers of an opposite pair of vertices in I give dihedral groups D_{3}
- stabilizers of an opposite pair of vertices in I_{h} give $D_3 \times \pm 1$

==== Edge stabilizers ====
Stabilizers of an opposite pair of edges can be interpreted as stabilizers of the rectangle they generate.

- edges stabilizers in I give cyclic groups Z_{2}
- edges stabilizers in I_{h} give Klein four-groups $Z_2 \times Z_2$
- stabilizers of a pair of edges in I give Klein four-groups $Z_2 \times Z_2$; there are 5 of these, given by rotation by 180° in 3 perpendicular axes.
- stabilizers of a pair of edges in I_{h} give $Z_2 \times Z_2 \times Z_2$; there are 5 of these, given by reflections in 3 perpendicular planes.

==== Face stabilizers ====
Stabilizers of an opposite pair of faces can be interpreted as stabilizers of the antiprism they generate.

- face stabilizers in I give cyclic groups C_{5}
- face stabilizers in I_{h} give groups C_{5v}, isomorphic to the dihedral group Dih_{5}
- stabilizers of an opposite pair of faces in I give dihedral groups D_{5}
- stabilizers of an opposite pair of faces in I_{h} give $D_5 \times \pm 1$

==== Polyhedron stabilizers ====
For each of these, there are 5 conjugate copies, and the conjugation action gives a map, indeed an isomorphism, $I \stackrel{\sim}\to A_5 < S_5$.

- stabilizers of the inscribed tetrahedra in I are a copy of T
- stabilizers of the inscribed tetrahedra in I_{h} are a copy of T
- stabilizers of the inscribed cubes (or opposite pair of tetrahedra, or octahedra) in I are a copy of T
- stabilizers of the inscribed cubes (or opposite pair of tetrahedra, or octahedra) in I_{h} are a copy of T_{h}

== Fundamental domain ==
Fundamental domains for the icosahedral rotation group and the full icosahedral group are given by:

Icosahedral rotation group I	Full icosahedral group I_{h}	Faces of disdyakis triacontahedron are the fundamental domain

In the disdyakis triacontahedron one full face is a fundamental domain; other solids with the same symmetry can be obtained by adjusting the orientation of the faces, e.g. flattening selected subsets of faces to combine each subset into one face, or replacing each face by multiple faces, or a curved surface.

== Polyhedra with icosahedral symmetry ==
Examples of other polyhedra with icosahedral symmetry include the regular dodecahedron (the dual of the icosahedron) and the rhombic triacontahedron.

=== Chiral polyhedra ===
Class	Symbols	Picture
Archimedean	sr{5,3}	
Catalan	V3.3.3.3.5	

=== Full icosahedral symmetry ===
Platonic solid	Kepler–Poinsot polyhedra		Archimedean solids				
{5,3}	{5/2,5}	{5/2,3}	t{5,3}	t{3,5}	r{3,5}	rr{3,5}	tr{3,5}
Platonic solid	Kepler–Poinsot polyhedra		Catalan solids				
{3,5} =	{5,5/2} =	{3,5/2} =	V3.10.10	V5.6.6	V3.5.3.5	V3.4.5.4	V4.6.10

== Occurrence ==
Examples of icosahedral symmetry

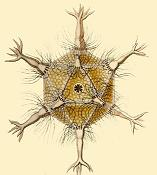
Circogonia icosahedra, a Radiolarian

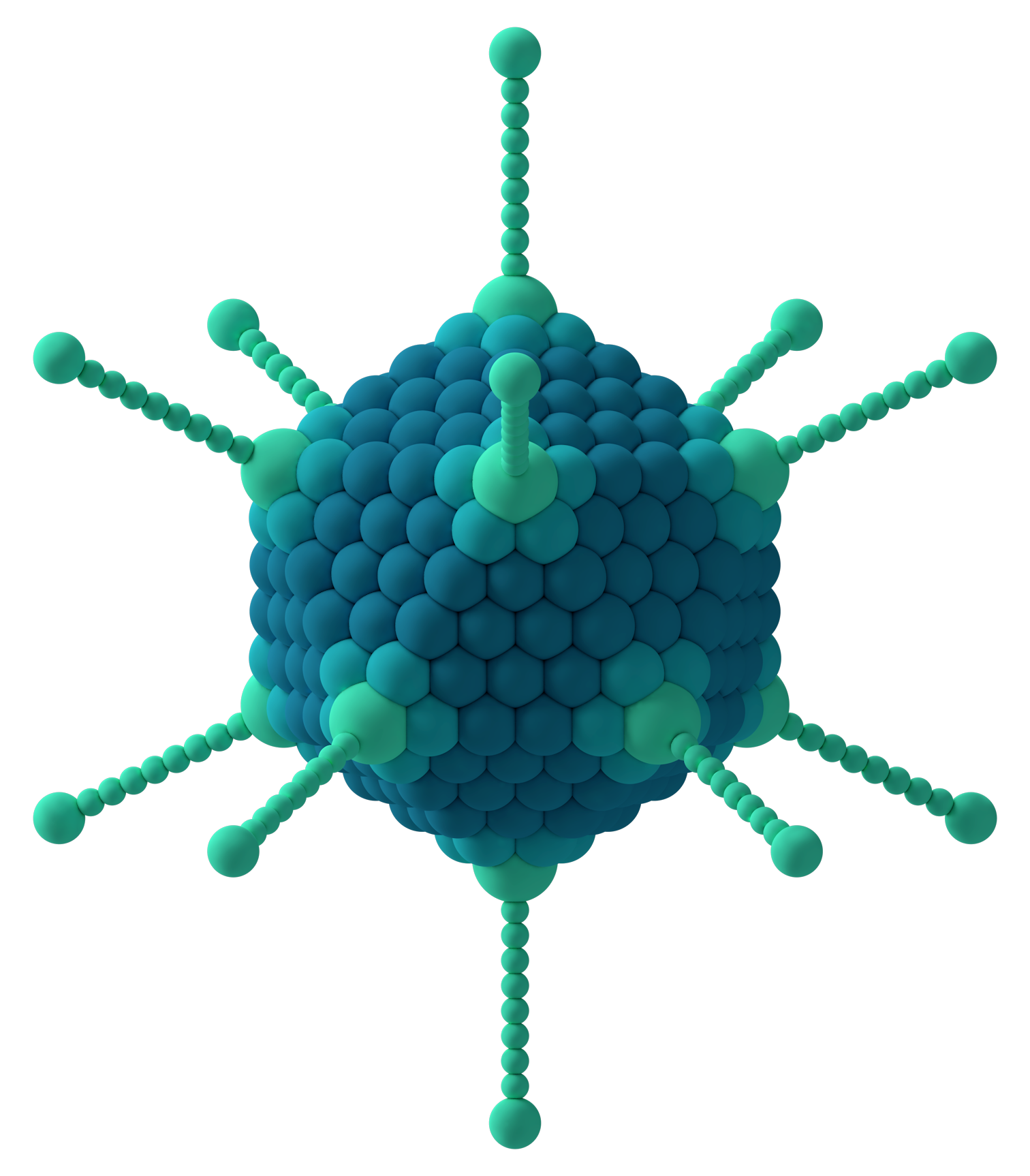
Capsid of an Adenovirus

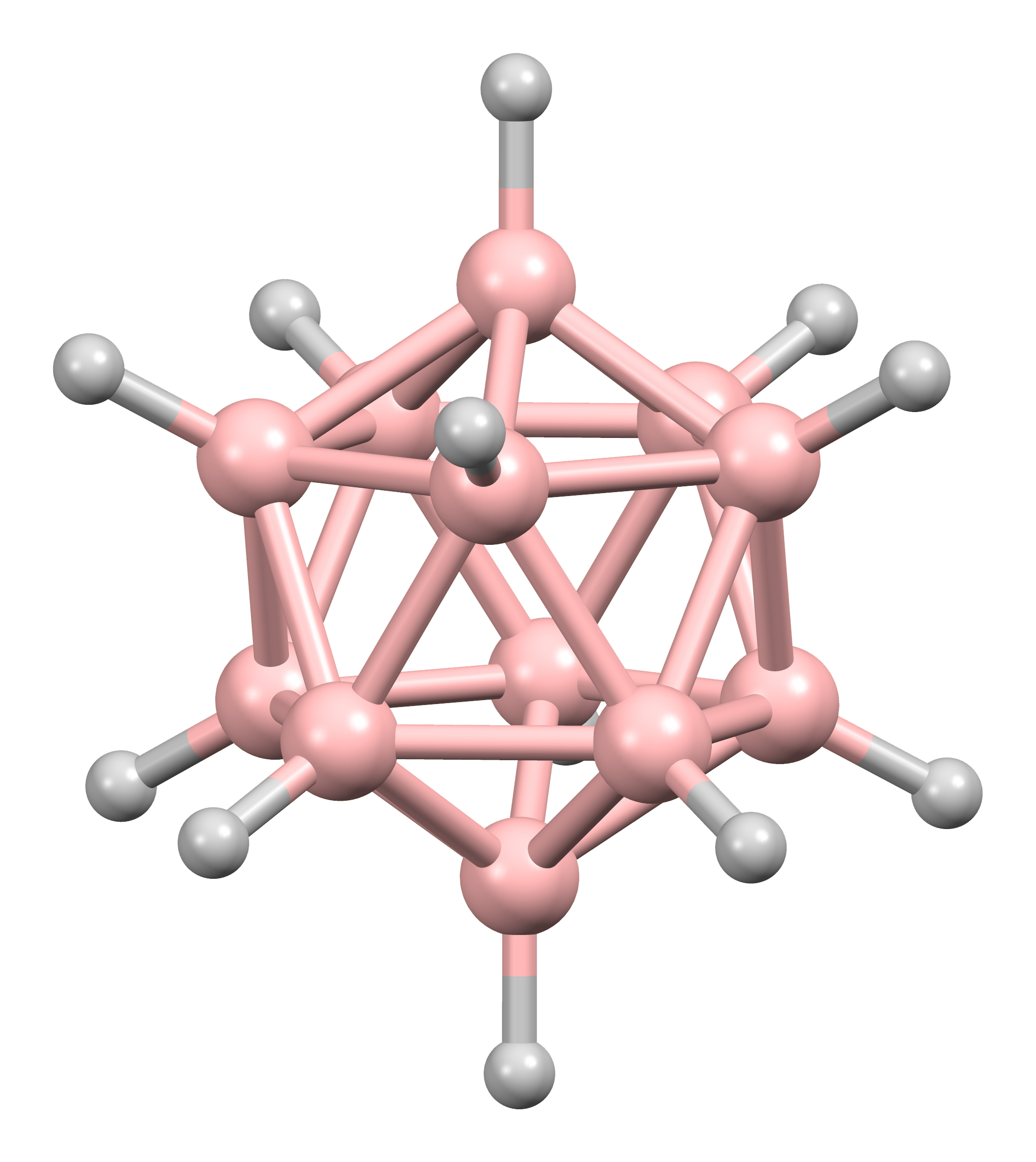
The dodecaborate ion [B_{12}H_{12}]^{2−}

The capsids of many viruses, such as the adenovirus, have icosahedral symmetry. In chemistry, examples are the dodecaborate ion ([B_{12}H_{12}]^{2−}), the dodecahedrane molecule (C_{20}H_{20}), and the buckminsterfullerene molecule (C_{60}), which has the shape of a truncated icosahedron.

In an aluminum–manganese alloy, icosahedral symmetry was discovered experimentally by Dan Shechtman, in the first known quasicrystal, which earned him the Nobel Prize in Chemistry in 2011. At small sizes, many elements form icosahedral nanoparticles, which are often lower in energy than single crystals. For cholesteric liquid crystals, lattice textures with icosahedral symmetry were proposed and analyzed by H. Kleinert and K. Maki in 1981.

In algebraic geometry, the Barth surfaces are examples of surfaces with icosahedral symmetry.

== Related geometries ==
Icosahedral symmetry is equivalently the projective special linear group PSL(2,5), and is the symmetry group of the modular curve X(5), and more generally PSL(2,p) is the symmetry group of the modular curve X(p). The modular curve X(5) is geometrically a dodecahedron with a cusp at the center of each polygonal face, which demonstrates the symmetry group.

This geometry, and associated symmetry group, was studied by Felix Klein as the monodromy groups of a Belyi surface – a Riemann surface with a holomorphic map to the Riemann sphere, ramified only at 0, 1, and infinity (a Belyi function) – the cusps are the points lying over infinity, while the vertices and the centers of each edge lie over 0 and 1; the degree of the covering (number of sheets) equals 60, and each cusp has width 5.

More exotically, there are special connections between the groups PSL(2,5) (order 60), PSL(2,7) (order 168) and PSL(2,11) (order 660), which also admit geometric interpretations – PSL(2,5) is the symmetries of the icosahedron (genus 0), PSL(2,7) of the Klein quartic (genus 3), and PSL(2,11) the buckyball surface (genus 70). These groups form a "trinity" in the sense of Vladimir Arnold, which gives a framework for the various relationships; see trinities for details.

Poincaré used the rotational symmetry group $I \subset \mathrm{SO}_3$ to construct the Poincaré homology sphere as the quotient manifold $X = \mathrm{SO}_3/I$, an important example of a space whose homology is the same as that of the sphere $S^3$, but which is not homotopic to it.
