= Final stellation of the icosahedron =

Outermost stellation of the icosahedron

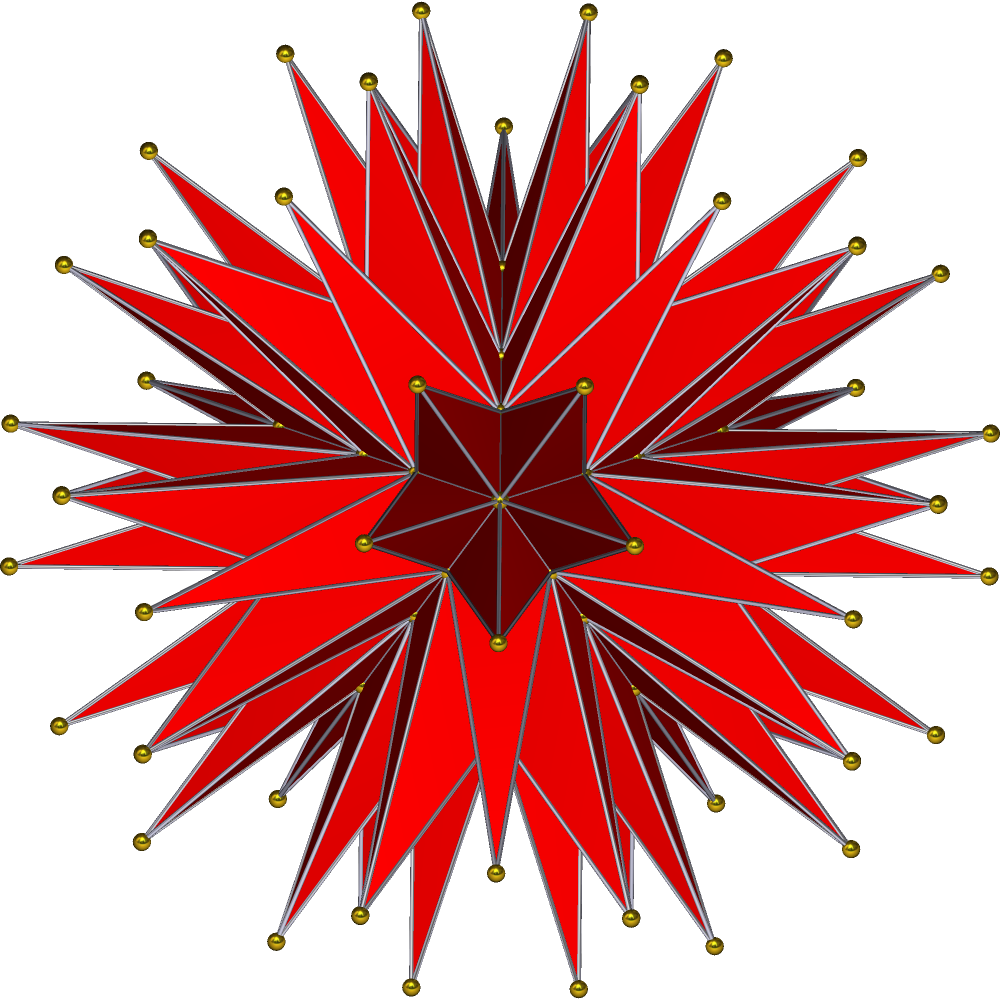
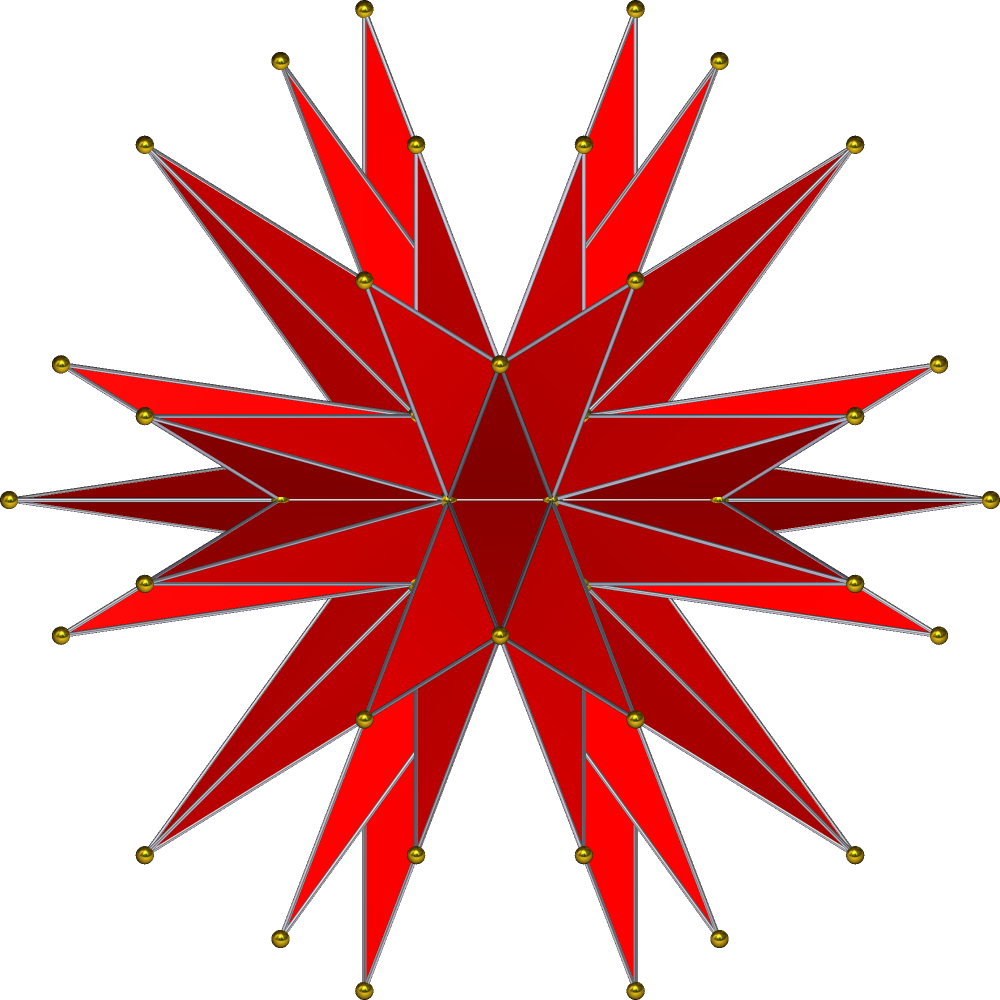
- Two symmetric orthographic projections
- Type: Stellated icosahedron, 8th of 59
- Euler char.: As a star polyhedron: F = 20, E = 90, V = 60 (χ = −10); As a simple polyhedron: F = 180, E = 270, V = 92 (χ = 2)
- Symmetry group: icosahedral (I_{h})
- Properties: As a star polyhedron: vertex-transitive, face-transitive

In geometry, the complete, final stellation of the icosahedron, or echidnahedron is the outermost stellation of the icosahedron, and is "complete" and "final" because it includes all of the cells in the icosahedron's stellation diagram. That is, every three intersecting face planes of the icosahedral core intersect either on a vertex of this polyhedron or inside of it. It was studied by Max Brückner after the discovery of Kepler–Poinsot polyhedron. It can be viewed as an irregular, simple, and star polyhedron.

== Background ==
Johannes Kepler in his Harmonices Mundi applied the stellation process, recognizing the small stellated dodecahedron and great stellated dodecahedron as regular polyhedra. However, Louis Poinsot in 1809 rediscovered two more, the great icosahedron and great dodecahedron. This was proved by Augustin-Louis Cauchy in 1812 that there are only four regular star polyhedra, known as the Kepler–Poinsot polyhedron.

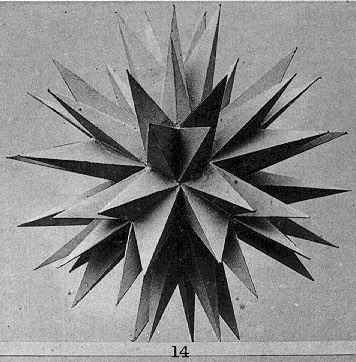
Brückner's model

Brückner (1900) extended the stellation theory beyond regular forms, and identified ten stellations of the icosahedron, including the complete stellation. Wheeler (1924) published a list of twenty stellation forms (twenty-two including reflective copies), also including the complete stellation. H. S. M. Coxeter, P. du Val, H. T. Flather and J. F. Petrie in their 1938 book The Fifty Nine Icosahedra stated a set of stellation rules for the regular icosahedron and gave a systematic enumeration of the fifty-nine stellations which conform to those rules. The complete stellation is referenced as the eighth in the book. In Wenninger's book Polyhedron Models, the final stellation of the icosahedron is included as the 17th model of stellated icosahedra with index number W_{42}.

== Interpretations ==
=== As a stellation ===
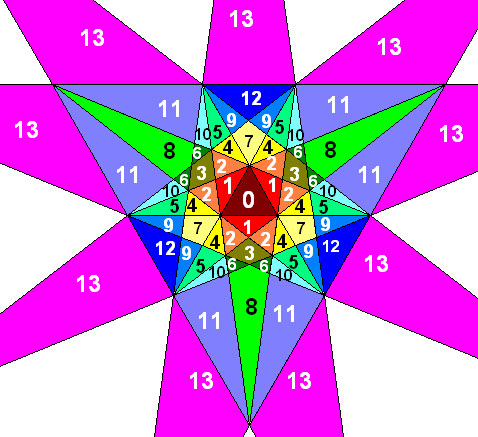
Stellation diagram of the icosahedron with numbered cells. The complete icosahedron is formed from all the cells in the stellation, but only the outermost regions, labelled "13" in the diagram, are visible.

The stellation of a polyhedron extends the faces of a polyhedron into infinite planes and generates a new polyhedron that is bounded by these planes as faces and the intersections of these planes as edges. The Fifty Nine Icosahedra enumerates the stellations of the regular icosahedron, according to a set of rules put forward by J. C. P. Miller, including the complete stellation. The Du Val symbol of the complete stellation is H, because it includes all cells in the stellation diagram up to and including the outermost "h" layer.

=== As a simple polyhedron ===
As a simple, visible surface polyhedron, the outward form of the final stellation is composed of 180 triangular faces, which are the outermost triangular regions in the stellation diagram. These join along 270 edges, which in turn meet at 92 vertices, with an Euler characteristic of 2.

3D model of the final stellation of the icosahedron

The 92 vertices lie on the surfaces of three concentric spheres. The innermost group of 20 vertices forms the vertices of a regular dodecahedron; the next layer of 12 forms the vertices of a regular icosahedron; and the outer layer of 60 forms the vertices of a nonuniform truncated icosahedron. The radii of these spheres are in the ratio
$$\sqrt {\frac {3}{2} \left (3 + \sqrt{5} \right ) } \, : \,
\sqrt {\frac {1}{2} \left (25 + 11\sqrt{5} \right ) } \, : \,
\sqrt {\frac {1}{2} \left (97 + 43\sqrt{5} \right ) } \, .$$

When regarded as a three-dimensional solid object with edge lengths $a$, $\varphi a$, $\varphi^2 a$ and $\varphi^2 a\sqrt{2}$ (where $\varphi$ is the golden ratio) the complete icosahedron has surface area and volume, respectively:
$$\begin{align}
S &= \frac{13211 + \sqrt{174306161}}{20}a^2 \\
V &= (210+90\sqrt{5})a^3.
\end{align}$$

=== As a star polyhedron ===
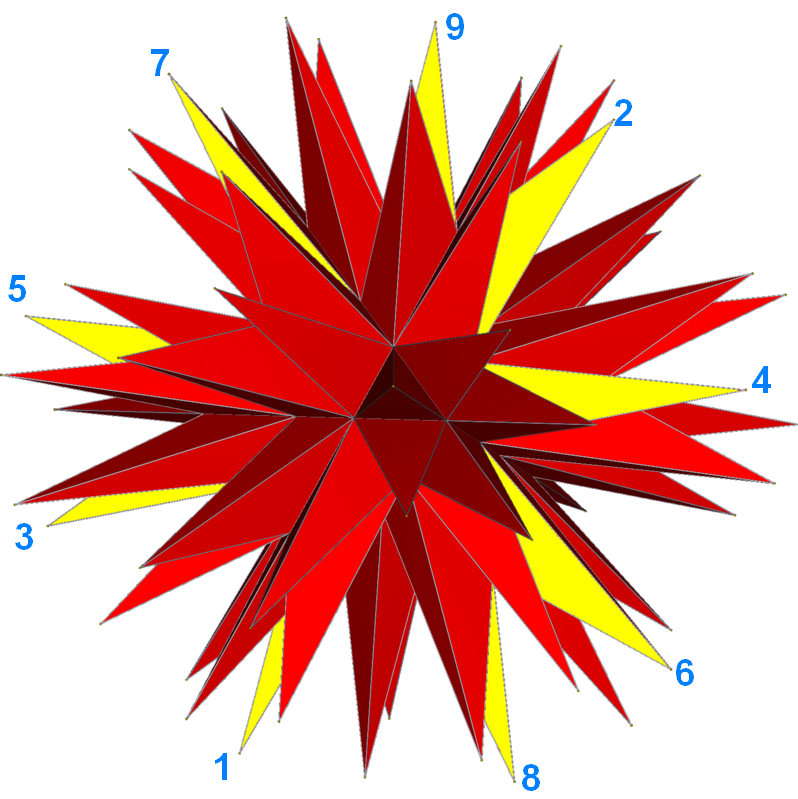
Twenty 9/4 polygon faces (one face is drawn yellow with 9 vertices labeled.)

2-isogonal 9/4 faces

The complete stellation can also be seen as a self-intersecting star polyhedron having 20 faces corresponding to the 20 faces of the underlying icosahedron. Each face is an irregular 9/4 star polygon, or enneagram. Since three faces meet at each vertex it has 20 × 9 / 3 = 60 vertices (these are the outermost layer of visible vertices and form the tips of the "spines") and 20 × 9 / 2 = 90 edges (each edge of the star polyhedron includes and connects two of the 180 visible edges).

When regarded as a star icosahedron, the complete stellation is a noble polyhedron, because it is both isohedral (face-transitive) and isogonal (vertex-transitive).

== Notes ==
Notable stellations of the icosahedron
Regular	Regular star	Uniform duals		
(Convex) icosahedron	Great icosahedron	Small triambic icosahedron	Medial triambic icosahedron	Great triambic icosahedron
Regular compounds			Others	
Compound of five octahedra	Compound of five tetrahedra	Compound of ten tetrahedra	Excavated dodecahedron	Final stellation
