= A. Harry Wheeler =

American mathematician, inventor, and mathematics teacher

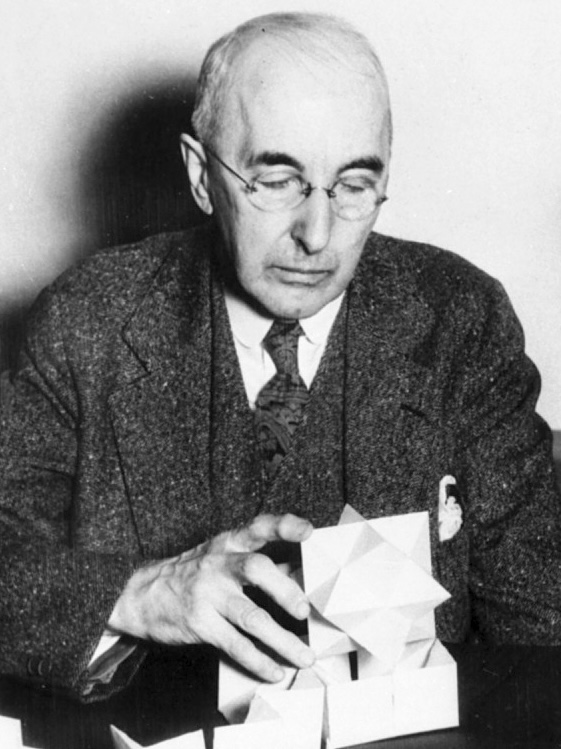
A. Harry Wheeler, 1937

Albert Harry Wheeler (18 January 1873, Leominster, Massachusetts – 1950) was an American mathematician, inventor, and mathematics teacher, known for physical construction (usually in paper) of polyhedral models and teaching this art to students.

== Education and career ==
A. Harry Wheeler received in 1894 his Bachelor of Science degree from Worcester Polytechnic Institute. He taught high school in Worcester, Massachusetts from 1894 to 1896 and then was a graduate student in mathematics from 1896 to 1899 at Clark University, but left without a degree. He taught high school mathematics in Worcester from 1899 to 1920. His textbooks are First Course in Algebra (1907) and Examples in Algebra (1914).

At age 47, returned in 1920 to graduate study in mathematics at Clark University, receiving a master's degree in 1921. Wheeler was an Invited Speaker of the ICM in 1924 at Toronto. In 1924 he began part-time teaching (in addition to his high school teaching) as an adjunct instructor of geometry, first at Brown University and then at Wellesley College; however, his college-level adjunct teaching ended by the early 1930s.

Wheeler and H. S. M. Coxeter planned to be coauthors (with two other mathematicians) of a short book, which was eventually named The Fifty-Nine Icosahedra and became a minor classic of mathematical literature. However, in 1938 Wheeler objected to Coxeter's expository style so that Coxeter replaced Wheeler's name on the book's title page by another author, although Wheeler is briefly mentioned in the text. Extending work of Max Brückner, Wheeler actually constructed previously unknown polyhedra. In particular, he produced new stellations of the icosahedron. This achievement impressed Coxeter, who noted Wheeler's achievement in the text.

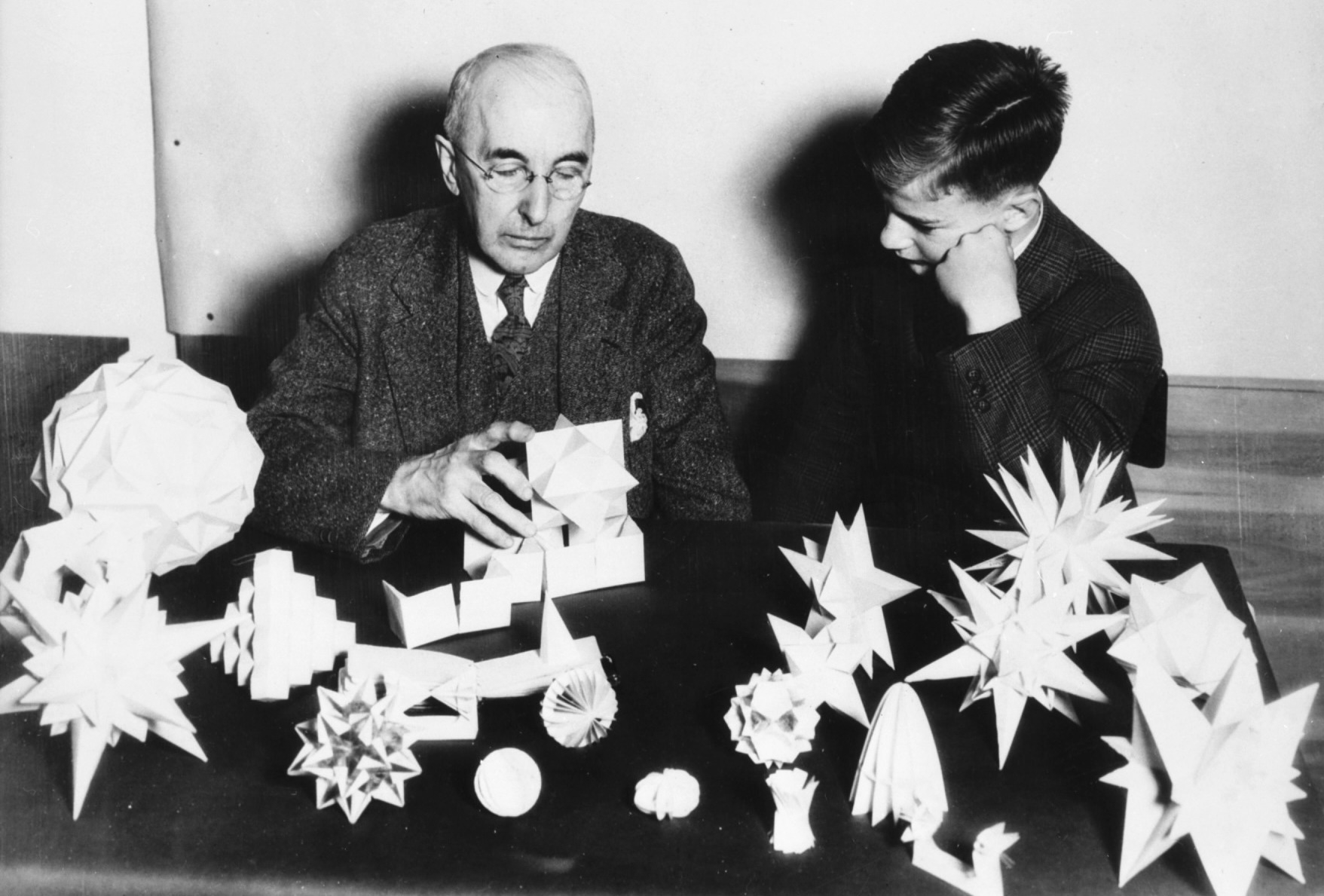
A. Harry Wheeler with a student and polyhedron models, 1937

== Later life and death ==
Wheeler continued teaching high school mathematics in Worcester until his retirement. His models continued to attract attention. In 1950 he received an invitation to exhibit part of his model collection at the 1950 ICM in Cambridge, Massachusetts from 30 August to September 6. However, serious illness prevented him from attending the conference, and he died in December 1950.

== Selected works ==
=== Books ===
- First Course in Algebra. Little, Brown and Company. 1907.
- Examples in Algebra. Little, Brown and Company. 1914.

=== Patents ===
- Blower for peas or the like. US Patent 921,764, 1909
- Playing-cards. US Patent 931,977, 1909
- with Albert A. Wheeler and Martin V. Haskins: Door. US Patent 0940294, 1909
- Puzzle. US Patent 959,903, 1910
- Mathematical model. US Patent 1,192,483, 1916
- Blank for forming hollow polyhedrons. US Patent 1,292,188, 1919
