= Small triambic icosahedron =

Small triambic icosahedron
Type	Dual uniform polyhedron
Index	DU_{30}, 2/59, W_{26}
Elements (As a star polyhedron)	F = 20, E = 60; V = 32 (χ = −8)
Symmetry group	icosahedral (I_{h})
Dual polyhedron	small ditrigonal icosidodecahedron
Stellation diagram / Stellation core / Convex hull; / Icosahedron / Pentakis dodecahedron

3D model of a small triambic icosahedron

In geometry, the small triambic icosahedron is a star polyhedron composed of 20 intersecting non-regular hexagon faces. It has 60 edges and 32 vertices, and Euler characteristic of −8. It is an isohedron, meaning that all of its faces are symmetric to each other. Branko Grünbaum conjectured that it is the only Euclidean isohedron with convex faces of six or more sides, but the small hexagonal hexecontahedron is another example.

== Geometry ==
The faces are equilateral hexagons, with alternating angles of $\arccos(-\frac{1}{4})\approx 104.477\,512\,185\,93^{\circ}$ and $\arccos(\frac{1}{4})+60^{\circ}\approx 135.522\,487\,814\,07^{\circ}$. The dihedral angle equals $\arccos(-\frac{1}{3})\approx 109.471\,220\,634\,49$.

== Related shapes ==
The external surface of the small triambic icosahedron (removing the parts of each hexagonal face that are hidden by other faces, but interpreting the resulting disconnected plane figures as still being faces) coincides with the first (B) stellation of the icosahedron. If instead, after removing the surrounded parts of each face, each resulting triple of coplanar triangles is considered to be three separate faces, then the result is one form of the triakis icosahedron, formed by adding a triangular pyramid to each face of an icosahedron.

The dual polyhedron of the small triambic icosahedron is the small ditrigonal icosidodecahedron. As this is a uniform polyhedron, the small triambic icosahedron is a uniform dual. Other uniform duals whose exterior surfaces are stellations of the icosahedron are the medial triambic icosahedron and the great triambic icosahedron.

Notable stellations of the icosahedron
Regular	Regular star	Uniform duals		
(Convex) icosahedron	Great icosahedron	Small triambic icosahedron	Medial triambic icosahedron	Great triambic icosahedron
Regular compounds			Others	
Compound of five octahedra	Compound of five tetrahedra	Compound of ten tetrahedra	Excavated dodecahedron	Final stellation
