= Great triambic icosahedron =

| | Great triambic icosahedron | Medial triambic icosahedron |
| Types | Dual uniform polyhedra | |
| Symmetry group | I_{h} | |
| Name | Great triambic icosahedron | Medial triambic icosahedron |
| Index references | DU_{47}, W_{34}, 30/59 | DU_{41}, W_{34}, 30/59 |
| Elements | F = 20, E = 60; V = 32 (χ = -8) | F = 20, E = 60; V = 24 (χ = -16) |
| Isohedral faces | | |
| Duals | Great ditrigonal icosidodecahedron | Ditrigonal dodecadodecahedron |
Stellation
Icosahedron: W_{34}
Stellation diagram

3D model of a medial triambic icosahedron

3D model of a great triambic icosahedron

In geometry, the great triambic icosahedron and medial triambic icosahedron (or midly triambic icosahedron) are visually identical dual uniform polyhedra. The exterior surface also represents the De_{2}f_{2} stellation of the icosahedron. These figures can be differentiated by marking which intersections between edges are true vertices and which are not. In the above images, true vertices are marked by gold spheres, which can be seen in the concave Y-shaped areas. Alternatively, if the faces are filled with the even–odd rule, the internal structure of both shapes will differ.

The 12 vertices of the convex hull matches the vertex arrangement of an icosahedron.

== Great triambic icosahedron ==
The great triambic icosahedron is the dual of the great ditrigonal icosidodecahedron, U47. It has 20 inverted-hexagonal (triambus) faces, shaped like a three-bladed propeller. It has 32 vertices: 12 exterior points, and 20 hidden inside. It has 60 edges.

The faces have alternating angles of $\arccos(\frac{1}{4})-60^{\circ}\approx 15.522\,487\,814\,07^{\circ}$ and $\arccos(-\frac{1}{4})\approx 104.477\,512\,185\,93^{\circ}$. The sum of the six angles is $360^{\circ}$, and not $720^{\circ}$ as might be expected for a hexagon, because the polygon turns around its center twice. The dihedral angle equals $\arccos(-\frac{1}{3})\approx 109.471\,220\,634\,49$.

== Medial triambic icosahedron ==
The medial triambic icosahedron is the dual of the ditrigonal dodecadodecahedron, U41. It has 20 faces, each being simple concave isotoxal hexagons or triambi. It has 24 vertices: 12 exterior points, and 12 hidden inside. It has 60 edges.

The faces have alternating angles of $\arccos(\frac{1}{4})-60^{\circ}\approx 15.522\,487\,814\,07^{\circ}$ and $\arccos(-\frac{1}{4})+120^{\circ}\approx 224.477\,512\,185\,93^{\circ}$. The dihedral angle equals $\arccos(-\frac{1}{3})\approx 109.471\,220\,634\,49$.

Unlike the great triambic icosahedron, the medial triambic icosahedron is topologically a regular polyhedron of index two. By distorting the triambi into regular hexagons, one obtains a quotient space of the hyperbolic order-5 hexagonal tiling:

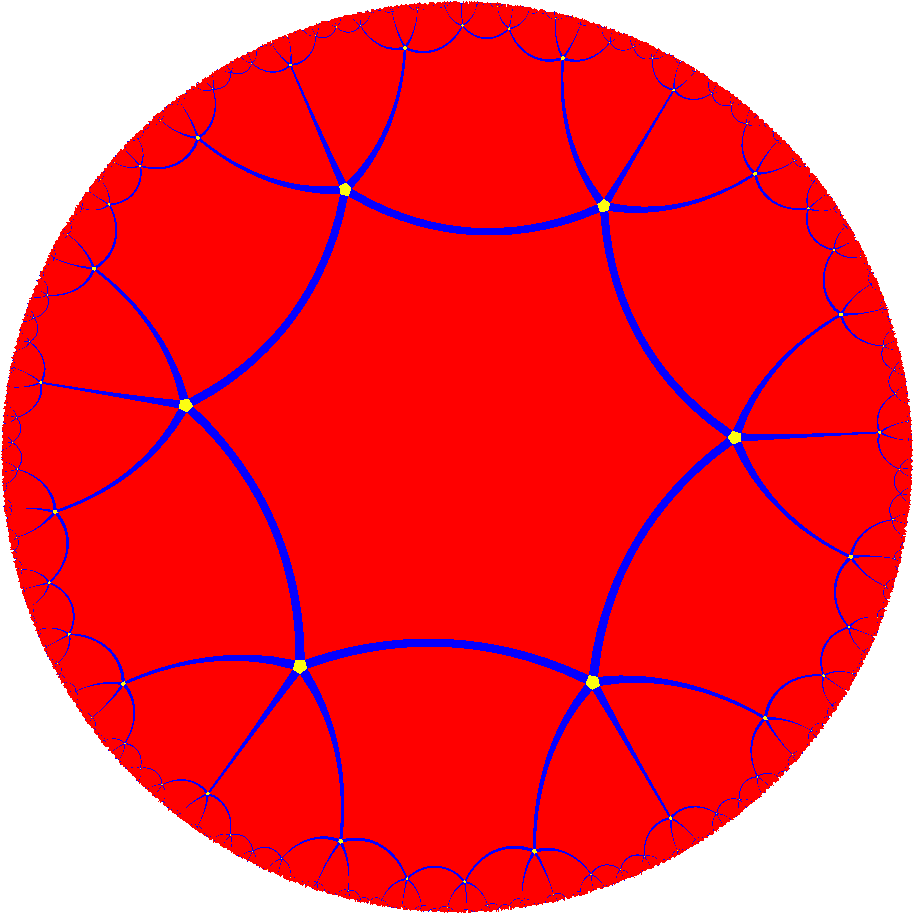

== As a stellation ==
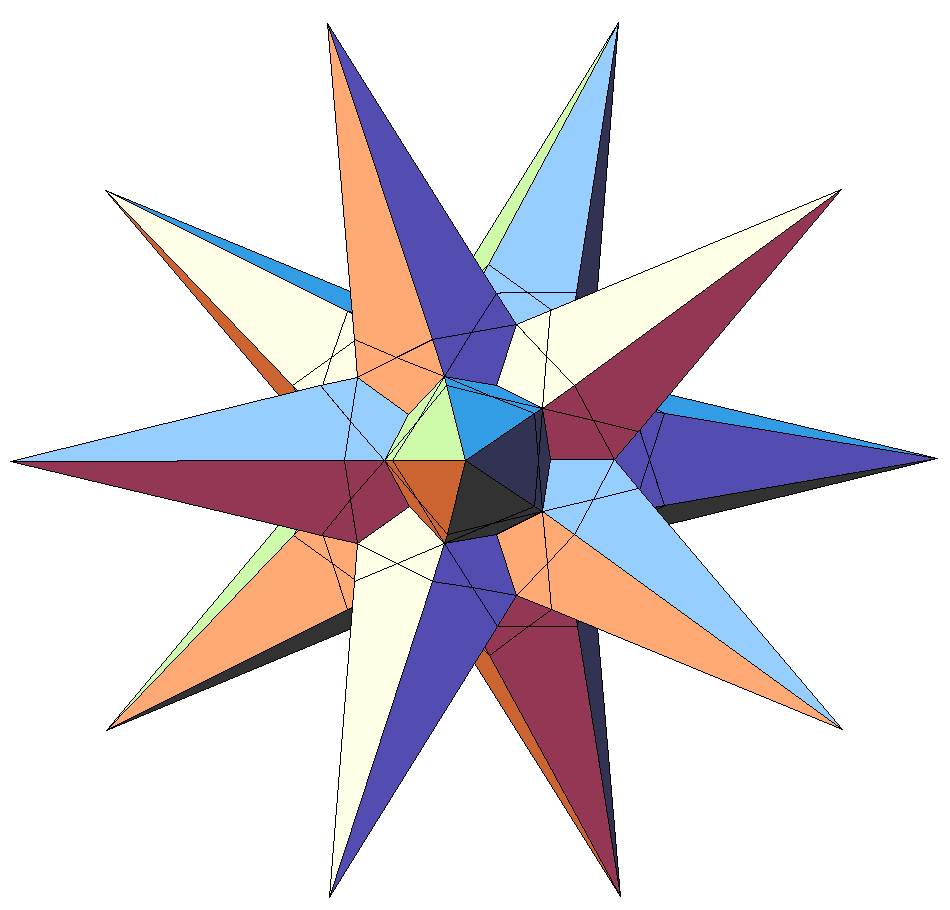
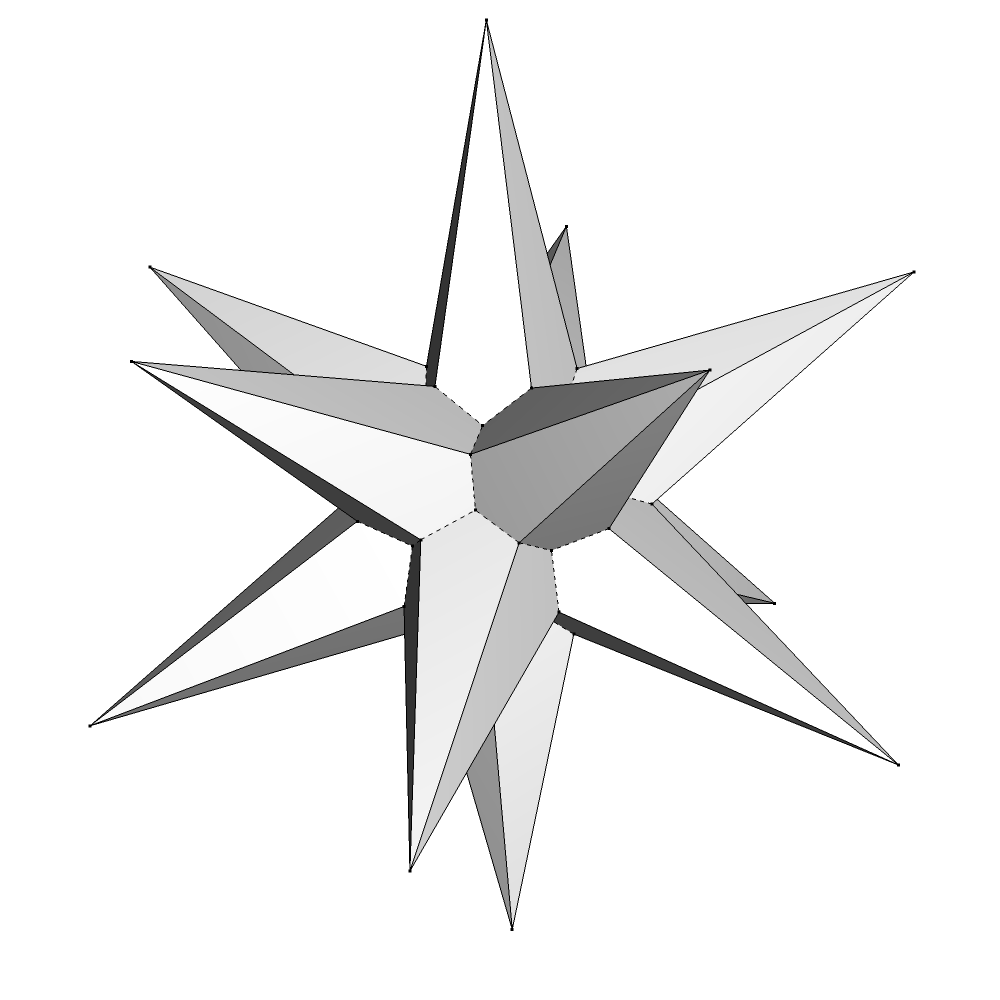

It is Wenninger's 34th model as his 9th stellation of the icosahedron

== See also ==
- Triakis icosahedron
- Small triambic icosahedron
- Medial rhombic triacontahedron

Notable stellations of the icosahedron
| Regular | Uniform duals | | | Regular compounds | | | Regular star | Others | |
| (Convex) icosahedron | Small triambic icosahedron | Medial triambic icosahedron | Great triambic icosahedron | Compound of five octahedra | Compound of five tetrahedra | Compound of ten tetrahedra | Great icosahedron | Excavated dodecahedron | Final stellation |
The stellation process on the icosahedron creates a number of related polyhedra and compounds with icosahedral symmetry.
