= Solids with icosahedral symmetry =

== Solids with full icosahedral symmetry ==
Platonic solids - regular polyhedra (all faces of the same type)

| {5,3} | {3,5} |

Archimedean solids - polyhedra with more than one polygon face type.

| 3.10.10 | 4.6.10 | 5.6.6 | 3.4.5.4 | 3.5.3.5 |

Catalan solids - duals of the Archimedean solids.

| V3.10.10 | V4.6.10 | V5.6.6 | V3.4.5.4 | V3.5.3.5 |

=== Platonic solids ===
| Name | Picture | Faces | Edges | Vertices | Edges per face | Faces meeting at each vertex |
|---|---|---|---|---|---|---|
| dodecahedron | (Animation) | 12 | 30 | 20 | 5 | 3 |
| icosahedron | (Animation) | 20 | 30 | 12 | 3 | 5 |

=== Achiral Archimedean solids ===
| Name | picture | Faces | | Edges | Vertices | Vertex configuration |
|---|---|---|---|---|---|---|
| icosidodecahedron (quasi-regular: vertex- and edge-uniform) | (Video) | 32 | 20 triangles 12 pentagons | 60 | 30 | 3,5,3,5 |
| truncated dodecahedron | (Video) | 32 | 20 triangles 12 decagons | 90 | 60 | 3,10,10 |
| truncated icosahedron or commonly football (soccer ball) | (Video) | 32 | 12 pentagons 20 hexagons | 90 | 60 | 5,6,6 |
| rhombicosidodecahedron or small rhombicosidodecahedron | (Video) | 62 | 20 triangles 30 squares 12 pentagons | 120 | 60 | 3,4,5,4 |
| truncated icosidodecahedron or great rhombicosidodecahedron | (Video) | 62 | 30 squares 20 hexagons 12 decagons | 180 | 120 | 4,6,10 |

=== Achiral Catalan solids ===
| Name | picture | Dual Archimedean solid | Faces | Edges | Vertices | Face Polygon |
|---|---|---|---|---|---|---|
| rhombic triacontahedron (quasi-regular dual: face- and edge-uniform) | (Video) | icosidodecahedron | 30 | 60 | 32 | rhombus |
| triakis icosahedron | (Video) | truncated dodecahedron | 60 | 90 | 32 | isosceles triangle |
| pentakis dodecahedron | (Video) | truncated icosahedron | 60 | 90 | 32 | isosceles triangle |
| deltoidal hexecontahedron | (Video) | rhombicosidodecahedron | 60 | 120 | 62 | kite |
| disdyakis triacontahedron or hexakis icosahedron | (Video) | truncated icosidodecahedron | 120 | 180 | 62 | scalene triangle |

== Chiral Archimedean and Catalan solids ==
Archimedean solids:

| Name | picture | Faces | | Edges | Vertices | Vertex configuration |
|---|---|---|---|---|---|---|
| snub dodecahedron or snub icosidodecahedron (2 chiral forms) | (Video) (Video) | 92 | 80 triangles 12 pentagons | 150 | 60 | 3,3,3,3,5 |

Catalan solids:

| Name | picture | Dual Archimedean solid | Faces | Edges | Vertices | Face Polygon |
|---|---|---|---|---|---|---|
| pentagonal hexecontahedron | (Video)(Video) | snub dodecahedron | 60 | 50 | 92 | irregular pentagon |

== Construction ==
Construction instructions for the following solids are available: Platonic solids, Archimedean solids, Achiral Catalan solids, Kepler–Poinsot solids, Achiral nonconvex uniform polyhedra, Chiral Archimedean and Catalan solids: Snub dodecahedron and Pentagonal hexecontahedron, and Chiral nonconvex uniform polyhedra.

== See also ==
- The Fifty Nine Icosahedra

== Works cited ==
- Wenninger, Magnus J. (1971). Polyhedron models. Cambridge: Cambridge University Press. ISBN 0521069173.
- Wenninger, Magnus J. (1983). Dual models. Cambridge; New York: Cambridge University Press. ISBN 0521245249.
