= Compound of ten tetrahedra =

Polyhedral compound

Compound of ten tetrahedra
Type	regular compound
Coxeter symbol	2{5,3}[10{3,3}]2{3,5}
Index	UC_{6}, W_{25}
Elements (As a compound)	10 tetrahedra: F = 40, E = 60, V = 20
Dual compound	Self-dual
Symmetry group	icosahedral (I_{h})
Subgroup restricting to one constituent	chiral tetrahedral (T)

3D model of a compound of ten tetrahedra

The compound of ten tetrahedra, also known as the icosicosahedron, is one of the five regular polyhedral compounds. This polyhedron can be seen as either a stellation of the icosahedron or a compound. This compound was first described by Edmund Hess in 1876.

It can be seen as a faceting of a regular dodecahedron.

== As a compound ==
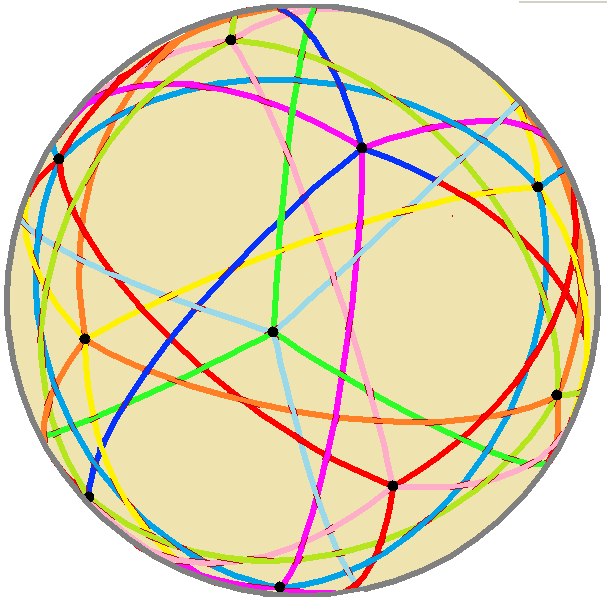
As a spherical tiling

It can also be seen as the compound of ten tetrahedra with full icosahedral symmetry (I_{h}). It is one of five regular compounds constructed from identical Platonic solids.

It shares the same vertex arrangement as a dodecahedron.

The compound of five tetrahedra represents two chiral halves of this compound (it can therefore be seen as a "compound of two compounds of five tetrahedra").

It can be made from the compound of five cubes by replacing each cube with a stella octangula on the cube's vertices (which results in a "compound of five compounds of two tetrahedra").

== As a stellation ==
This polyhedron is a stellation of the icosahedron, and given as Wenninger model index 25.

Stellation diagram	Stellation core	Convex hull
	Icosahedron	Dodecahedron

== As a facetting ==
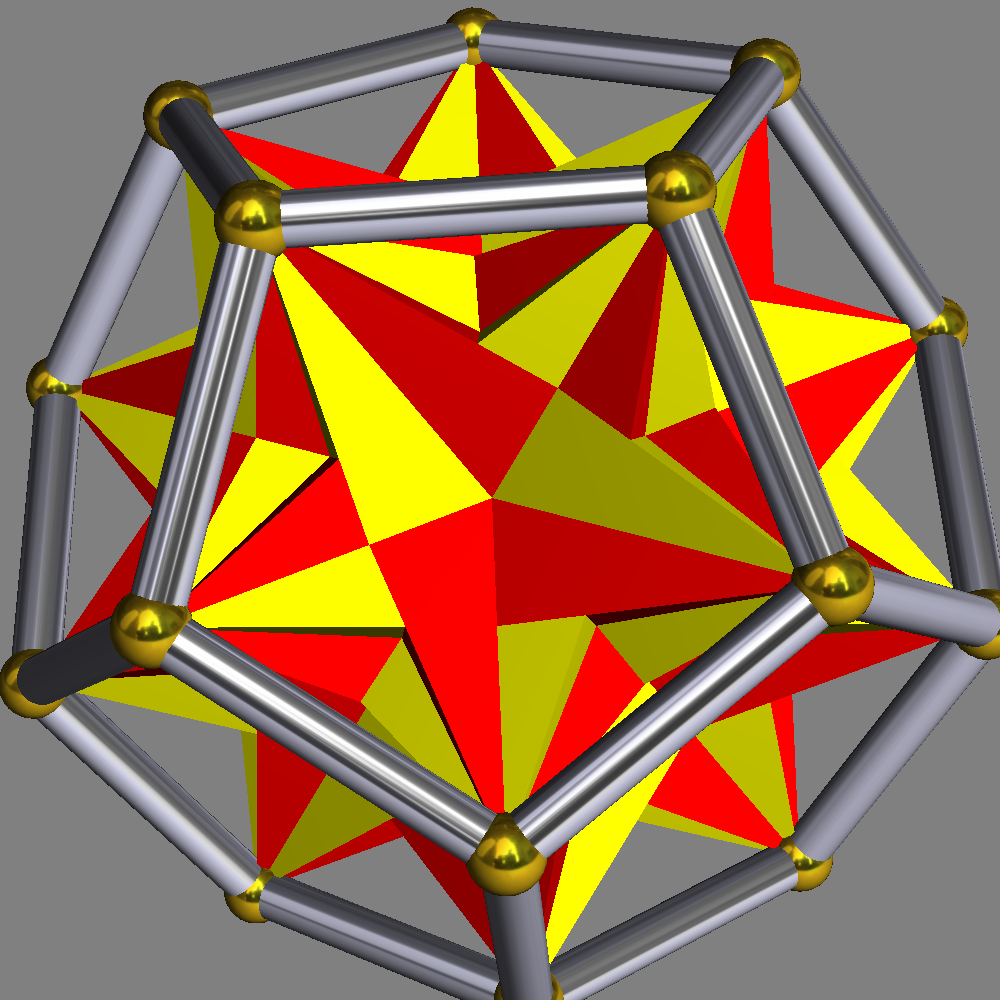
Ten tetrahedra in a dodecahedron.

It is also a facetting of the dodecahedron, as shown at left. Concave pentagrams can be seen on the compound where the pentagonal faces of the dodecahedron are positioned.

== As a simple polyhedron ==
If it is treated as a simple non-convex polyhedron without self-intersecting surfaces, it has 180 faces (120 triangles and 60 concave quadrilaterals), 122 vertices (60 with degree 3, 30 with degree 4, 12 with degree 5, and 20 with degree 12), and 300 edges, giving an Euler characteristic of 122-300+180 = +2.

== See also ==
- Compound of five tetrahedra

Notable stellations of the icosahedron
Regular	Regular star	Uniform duals		
(Convex) icosahedron	Great icosahedron	Small triambic icosahedron	Medial triambic icosahedron	Great triambic icosahedron
Regular compounds			Others	
Compound of five octahedra	Compound of five tetrahedra	Compound of ten tetrahedra	Excavated dodecahedron	Final stellation
