= Icosoku =

IcoSoku is a puzzle invented in 2009 by Andrea Mainini and sold by Recent Toys International, which is based in the Netherlands. It won several awards in 2010.

The puzzle frame is a blue plastic icosahedron, and the pieces are 20 white equilateral-triangular snap-in tiles with black dots and 12 yellow pins for the corners. The pins are printed with the numbers from 1 to 12, and the triangular tiles have up to three dots in each of their corners. The object of the game is, for any arrangement of the pins, to choose the positions and orientations of the triangles so that the total number of dots on the five joining corners of each pin equals the number of the pin. The manufacturer asserts that there is a solution for each pin arrangement. The puzzle is shipped in a solved state. The pins are not suitable for children under three, but this toy is otherwise suitable for all ages.
