= Patrick du Val =

British mathematician (1903–1987)

Patrick du Val (March 26, 1903 – January 22, 1987) was a British mathematician, known for his work on algebraic geometry, differential geometry, and general relativity. The concept of Du Val singularity of an algebraic surface is named after him.

== Early life ==
Du Val was born in Cheadle Hulme, Cheshire. He was the son of a cabinet maker, but his parents' marriage broke up. As a child, he suffered ill-health, in particular asthma, and was educated mostly by his mother. He was awarded a first class honours degree from the University of London External Programme in 1926, which he took by correspondence course.

He was a talented linguist, for example teaching himself Norwegian so that he might read Peer Gynt. He also had a strong interest in history but his love of mathematics led him to pursue that as a career. His earliest publications show a leaning towards applied mathematics.

His mother moved to a village near Cambridge and he became acquainted with Henry Baker, Lowndean Professor of Astronomy and Geometry. Baker turned his interest towards algebraic geometry, and he entered Trinity College, Cambridge in 1927.

== Research in geometry ==
Du Val's early work before becoming a research student was on relativity, including a paper on the De Sitter model of the universe and Grassmann's tensor calculus. His doctorate was on algebraic geometry and in his thesis he generalised a result of Schoute. He worked on algebraic surfaces and later in his career became interested in elliptic functions.

He received his Ph.D. with a thesis entitled 'On Certain Configurations of Algebraic Geometry Having Groups of Self-Transformations Representable by Symmetry Groups of Certain Polygons' under Baker's supervision in 1930. While a research student he had many famous geometers including Hodge as fellow research students, and he formed a particular friendship with Coxeter and Semple. He was elected a fellow of Trinity in 1930 for four years. During that time he travelled extensively, visiting Rome and working with Federigo Enriques, then in 1934 Princeton University, where he attended lectures by James W. Alexander, Luther P. Eisenhart, Solomon Lefschetz, Oswald Veblen, Joseph Wedderburn, and Hermann Weyl.

In 1936, Du Val took up an assistant lectureship in the Mathematics Department at Manchester, where he stayed for five years. He was then funded by a British Council scheme to go to Istanbul University as a professor of pure mathematics. There he learnt Turkish and even wrote a book on coordinate geometry in that language.

After a spell in the United States at the University of Georgia, he returned to the United Kingdom, first taking up a post in Bristol, then at the University College London in 1954, where he remained until he retired in 1970. Together with Semple he led the London Geometry Seminar during the time he spent in London.

Du Val had three children.

== Later life ==
After retirement, Du Val returned to Istanbul. For three years he held the same post as before, and then as if reversing history, settled down to a retirement in Cambridge.

He is remembered as an interesting character. For example, in Manchester during the war he was remembered as a cloaked figure striding the parapets, as he carried out his duties as a fire warden. He was also known for startling the travelling public by carrying around a large string bag filled with garishly coloured stellated icosahedra.

== Work ==
- Du Val, Patrick (1934a), "On isolated singularities of surfaces which do not affect the conditions of adjunction. I", Proceedings of the Cambridge Philosophical Society, 30 (4): 453–459, doi:10.1017/S030500410001269X, S2CID 251095858, Zbl 0010.17602
- Du Val, Patrick (1934b), "On isolated singularities of surfaces which do not affect the conditions of adjunction. II", Proceedings of the Cambridge Philosophical Society, 30 (4): 460–465, doi:10.1017/S0305004100012706, S2CID 197459819, Zbl 0010.17603
- Du Val, Patrick (1934c), "On isolated singularities of surfaces which do not affect the conditions of adjunction. III", Proceedings of the Cambridge Philosophical Society, 30 (4): 483–491, doi:10.1017/S030500410001272X, S2CID 251095521, Zbl 0010.17701
- 1938: (with H. S. M. Coxeter, H.T. Flather, J.F. Petrie) The Fifty-Nine Icosahedra, University of Toronto studies, mathematical series 6: 1–26.
- 1952: On surfaces whose canonical system is hyperelliptic, Canadian Journal of Mathematics 4: 204–221. MR 0048090
- 1964: Homographies, quaternions and rotations, Oxford Mathematical Monographs, Clarendon Press, Oxford. MR 0169108
- 1973: Elliptic functions and elliptic curves, London Mathematical Society Lecture Note Series, No. 9, Cambridge University Press, London-New York. MR 0379512 ISBN 0-521-20036-9
