= Stellation diagram =

The stellation diagram for the regular dodecahedron with the central pentagon highlighted. This diagram represents the dodecahedron face itself.

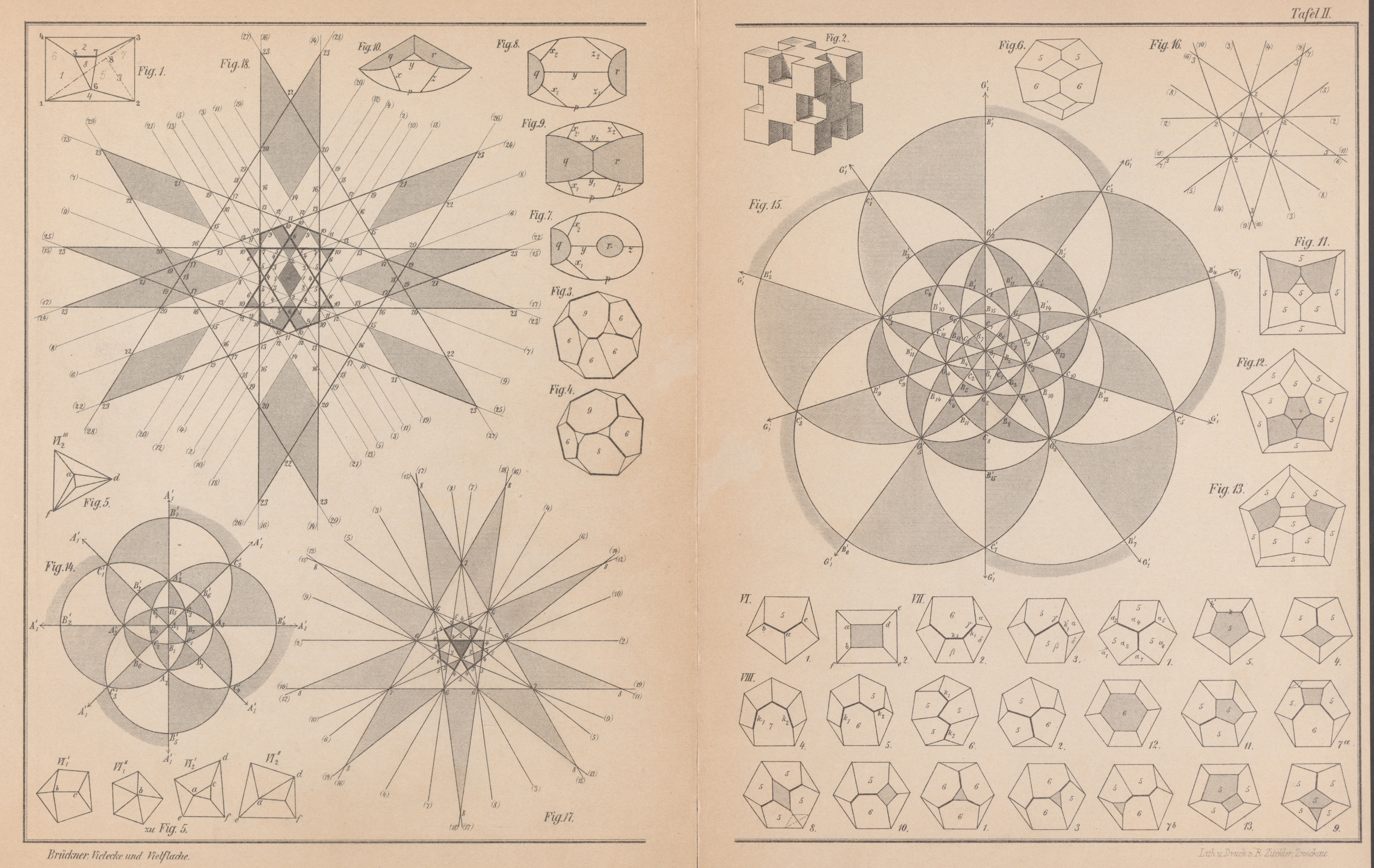
Drawings by Max Brückner (1900). The stellation diagram of the dodecahedron (including unbounded regions) is shown in the top right. On the left page are stellation diagrams related to the compound of five cubes and its dual.

In geometry, a stellation diagram or stellation pattern is a two-dimensional diagram in the plane of some face of a polyhedron, showing lines where other face planes intersect with this one. The lines cause 2D space to be divided up into regions. Regions not intersected by any further lines are called elementary regions. Usually unbounded regions are excluded from the diagram, along with any portions of the lines extending to infinity. Each elementary region represents a top face of one cell, and a bottom face of another.

A collection of these diagrams, one for each face type, can be used to represent any stellation of the polyhedron, by shading the regions which should appear in that stellation.

A stellation diagram exists for every face of a given polyhedron. In face transitive polyhedra, symmetry can be used to require all faces have the same diagram shading. Semiregular polyhedra like the Archimedean solids will have different stellation diagrams for different kinds of faces.

== See also ==
- List of Wenninger polyhedron models
- The fifty nine icosahedra
