= Triaugmented truncated dodecahedron =

71st Johnson solid (62 faces)

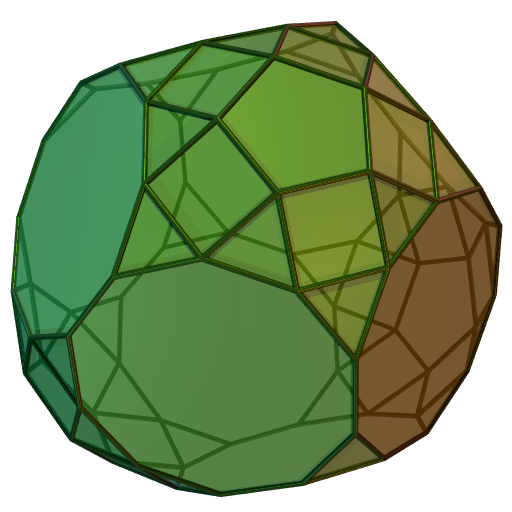
- Type: Johnson; J_{70} – J_{71} – J_{72}
- Faces: 2+3×3+4×6 triangles 3+2×6 squares 3 pentagons 3×3 decagons
- Edges: 135
- Vertices: 75
- Vertex configuration: 4×3+3×6(3.10^{2}); 3+2×6(3.4.5.4); 5×6(3.4.3.10)
- Symmetry group: C_{3v}
- Dual polyhedron: -
- Properties: convex

Net
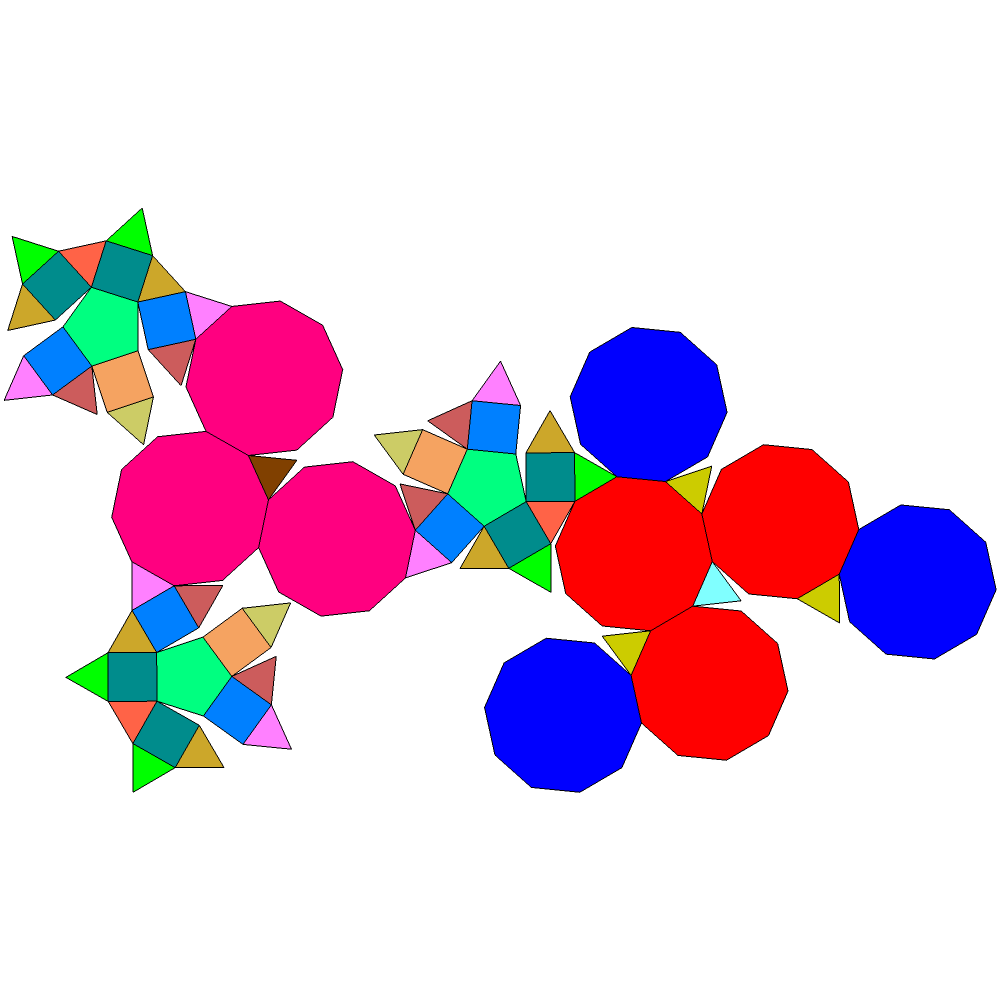

In geometry, the triaugmented truncated dodecahedron is one of the Johnson solids (J_{71}). Of them, it has the greatest surface area and volume for a given side length, as well as the greatest numbers of edges and vertices; it is tied for the greatest number of faces with J_{72}, J_{73}, J_{74}, and J_{75}. As its name suggests, it is created by attaching three pentagonal cupolas (J_{5}) onto three nonadjacent decagonal faces of a truncated dodecahedron.

A Johnson solid is one of 92 strictly convex polyhedra that are composed of regular polygon faces but are not uniform polyhedra (that is, they are not Platonic solids, Archimedean solids, prisms, or antiprisms). They were named by Norman Johnson, who first listed these polyhedra in 1966.

3D model of a triaugmented truncated dodecahedron
