= Prince Rupert's cube =

Cube that fits through hole in smaller cube

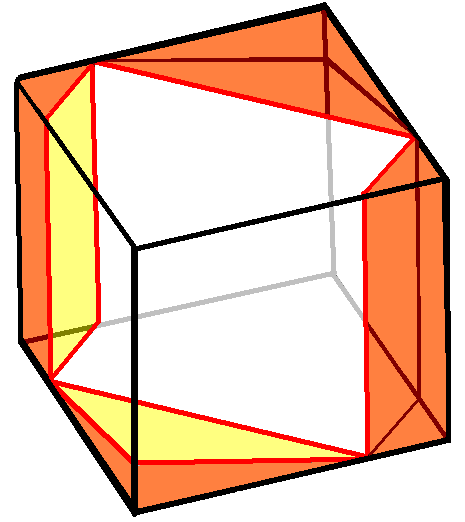
A unit cube with a hole cut through it, large enough to allow Prince Rupert's cube to pass

In geometry, Prince Rupert's cube is the largest cube that can pass through a hole cut through a unit cube without splitting it into separate pieces. Its side length is approximately 1.06, 6% larger than the side length 1 of the unit cube through which it passes. The problem of finding the largest square that lies entirely within a unit cube is closely related, and has the same solution.

Prince Rupert's cube is named after Prince Rupert of the Rhine, who asked whether a cube could be passed through a hole made in another cube of the same size without splitting the cube into two pieces. A positive answer was given by John Wallis. Approximately 100 years later, Pieter Nieuwland found the largest possible cube that can pass through a hole in a unit cube.

Many other convex polyhedra, including all five Platonic solids, have been shown to have the Rupert property: a copy of the polyhedron, of the same or larger size, can be passed through a hole in the polyhedron. It was unknown whether this was true for all convex polyhedra until late 2025, when it was disproven by researchers Jakob Steininger and Sergey Yurkevich after developing the "noperthedron" shape.

== Solution ==
A trimetric projection of a cube with unit side length with selected dimensions labelled. The green dash-dot line shows a unit square (cross-section of a unit cube) in the hole (blue dashed line).

Place two points on two adjacent edges of a unit cube, each at a distance of 3/4 from the point where the two edges meet, and two more points symmetrically on the opposite face of the cube. Then these four points form a square with side length
$$\frac{3\sqrt{2}}{4} \approx 1.0606601.$$
One way to see this is to first observe that these four points form a rectangle, by the symmetries of their construction. The lengths of all four sides of this rectangle equal $(3\sqrt{2})/4$, by the Pythagorean theorem or (equivalently) the formula for Euclidean distance in three dimensions. For instance, the first two points, together with the third point where their two edges meet, form an isosceles right triangle with legs of length $3/4$, and the distance between the first two points is the hypotenuse of the triangle. As a rectangle with four equal sides, the shape formed by these four points is a square. Extruding the square in both directions perpendicularly to itself forms the hole through which a cube larger than the original one, up to side length $(3\sqrt{2})/4$, may pass.

The parts of the unit cube that remain, after emptying this hole, form two triangular prisms and two irregular tetrahedra, connected by thin bridges at the four vertices of the square. Each prism has six vertices: two are adjacent vertices of the cube, and the remaining four lie on the cube’s edges, each located at a distance of 1/4 from those cube vertices. Each tetrahedron has as its four vertices one vertex of the cube, two points at distance 3/4 from it on two of the adjacent edges, and one point at distance 3/16 from the cube vertex along the third adjacent edge.

A unit cube with a hole cut through it (3D model)

== History ==
Prince Rupert's cube is named after Prince Rupert of the Rhine. According to a story recounted in 1693 by English mathematician John Wallis, Prince Rupert wagered that a hole could be cut through a cube, large enough to let another cube of the same size pass through it. Wallis showed that in fact such a hole was possible (with some errors that were not corrected until much later), and Prince Rupert won his wager.

Wallis assumed that the hole would be parallel to a space diagonal of the cube. The projection of the cube onto a plane perpendicular to this diagonal is a regular hexagon, and the best hole parallel to the diagonal can be found by drawing the largest possible square that can be inscribed into this hexagon. Calculating the size of this square shows how a cube’s side length determines its volume.

$$\sqrt 6 -\sqrt 2\approx 1.03527,$$

slightly larger than one, is capable of passing through the hole.

Approximately 100 years later, Dutch mathematician Pieter Nieuwland found that a better solution may be achieved by using a hole with a different angle than the space diagonal. In fact, Nieuwland's solution is optimal. Nieuwland died in 1794, a year after taking a position as a professor at the University of Leiden, and his solution was published posthumously in 1816 by Nieuwland's mentor, Jean Henri van Swinden.

Since then, the problem has been repeated in many books on recreational mathematics, in some cases with Wallis' suboptimal solution instead of the optimal solution.

== Models ==
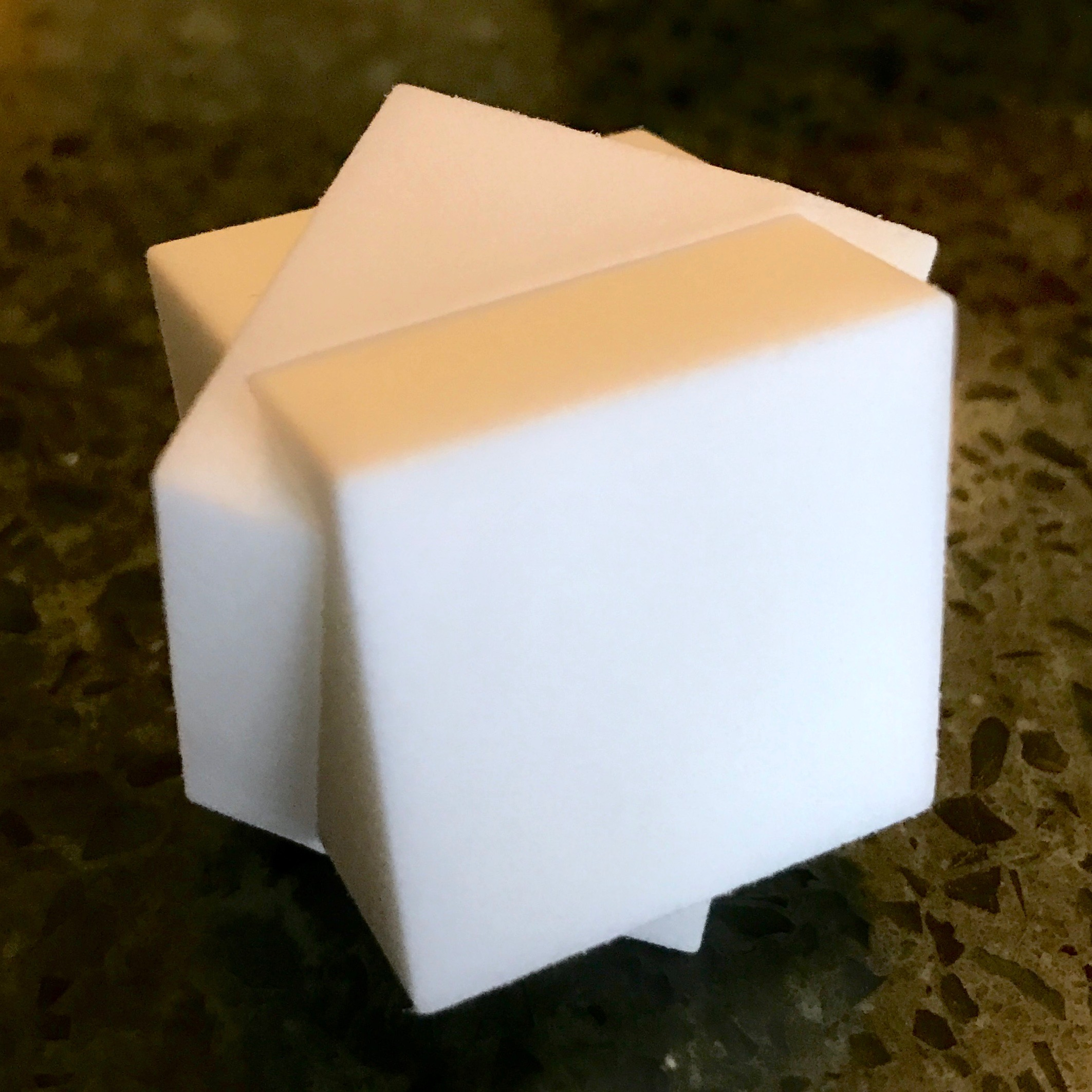
3D-printed Prince Rupert's Cube with 1:1 ratio of inner cube to outer cube.

The construction of a physical model of Prince Rupert's cube is made challenging by the accuracy with which such a model needs to be measured, and the thinness of the connections between the remaining parts of the unit cube after the hole is cut through it. For the maximally sized inner cube with length ≈1.06 relative to the length 1 outer cube, constructing a model is "mathematically possible but practically impossible". On the other hand, using the orientation of the maximal cube but making a smaller hole, big enough only for a unit cube, leaves additional thickness that allows for structural integrity.

For the example using two cubes of the same size, as originally proposed by Prince Rupert, model construction is possible. In a 1950 survey of the problem, D. J. E. Schrek published photographs of a model of a cube passing through a hole in another cube. Martin Raynsford has designed a template for constructing paper models of a cube with another cube passing through it; however, to account for the tolerances of paper construction and not tear the paper at the narrow joints between parts of the punctured cube, the hole in Raynsford's model only lets cubes through that are slightly smaller than the outer cube.

== Generalizations ==
=== Other polyhedra ===
A polyhedron $P$ is said to have the Rupert property if a polyhedron of the same or larger size and the same shape as $P$ can pass through a hole in $P$. All five Platonic solids—the cube, regular tetrahedron, regular octahedron, regular dodecahedron, and regular icosahedron—have the Rupert property. Of the 13 Archimedean solids, it is known that at least these ten have the Rupert property: the cuboctahedron, truncated octahedron, truncated cube, rhombicuboctahedron, icosidodecahedron, truncated cuboctahedron, truncated icosahedron, truncated dodecahedron, and the truncated tetrahedron, as well as the truncated icosidodecahedron.

Cubes and all rectangular solids have Rupert passages in every direction that is not parallel to any of their faces.

Another way to express the same problem is to ask for the largest square that lies within a unit cube. More generally, Jerrard & Wetzel (2004) show how to find the largest rectangle of a given aspect ratio that lies within a unit cube. As they observe, the optimal rectangle must always be centered at the center of the cube, with its vertices on the edges of the cube. Depending on its aspect ratio, the ratio between its long and short sides, there are two cases for how it can be placed within the cube. For an aspect ratio of $\sqrt2$ or more, the optimal rectangle lies within the rectangle connecting two opposite edges of the cube, which has aspect ratio exactly $\sqrt2$. For aspect ratios closer to 1 (including aspect ratio 1 for the square of Prince Rupert's cube), two of the four vertices of an optimal rectangle are equidistant from a vertex of the cube, along two of the three edges touching that vertex. The other two rectangle vertices are the reflections of the first two across the center of the cube. If the aspect ratio is not constrained, the rectangle with the largest area that fits within a cube is the one of aspect ratio $\sqrt2$ that has two opposite edges of the cube as two of its sides, and two face diagonals as the other two sides.

Eleven of the 13 Catalan solids and 87 of the 92 Johnson solids are known to have the Rupert property. The Catalan solids for which the Rupert property is not known are the deltoidal hexecontahedron and pentagonal hexecontahedron. The Johnson solids for which the Rupert property is not known are the gyrate rhombicosidodecahedron $J_{72}$, parabigyrate rhombicosidodecahedron $J_{73}$, metabigyrate rhombicosidodecahedron $J_{74}$, trigyrate rhombicosidodecahedron $J_{75}$, and paragyrate diminished rhombicosidodecahedron $J_{77}$.

=== Noperthedron and non-Rupert polyhedra ===
The Noperthedron

It was conjectured in 2017 that all 3-dimensional convex polyhedra had this property, but also, to the contrary, that the rhombicosidodecahedron did not have Rupert's property.

More recently, a preprint by Steininger & Yurkevich (2025) describes a counterexample, which they call the Noperthedron: an explicit convex polyhedron that is not Rupert. The Noperthedron is point-symmetric and counts 90 vertices, 240 edges, and 152 faces: 150 triangles and two regular pentadecagons, depicted as the two bases of the polyhedron.

=== Higher dimensions ===
For all $n\geq 2$, the $n$-dimensional hypercube also has the Rupert property. Moreover, one may ask for the largest $m$-dimensional hypercube that may be drawn within an $n$-dimensional unit hypercube. The answer is always an algebraic number. For instance, the problem for $(m,n)=(3,4)$ asks for the largest (three-dimensional) cube within a four-dimensional hypercube. After Martin Gardner posed this question in Scientific American, Kay R. Pechenick DeVicci and several other readers showed that the answer for the (3,4) case is the square root of the smaller of two real roots of the polynomial $4x^4-28x^3-7x^2+16x+16$, which works out to approximately 1.007435. For $m=2$, the optimal side length of the largest square in an $n$-dimensional hypercube is either $\sqrt{n/2}$ or $\sqrt{n/2-3/8}$, depending on whether $n$ is even or odd respectively.
