= Parabigyrate rhombicosidodecahedron =

73rd Johnson solid (62 faces)

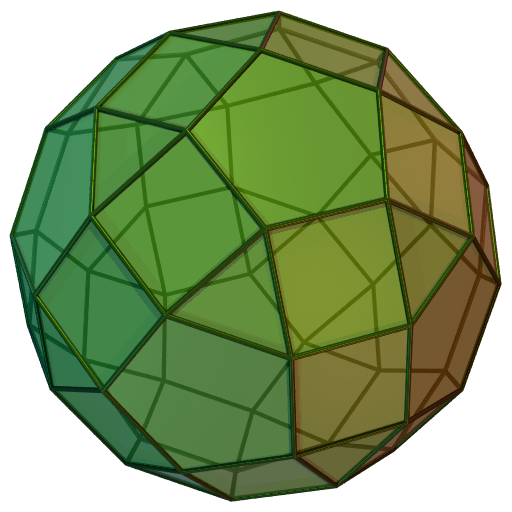
- Type: Johnson; J_{72} – J_{73} – J_{74}
- Faces: 2×10 triangles 3×10 squares 2+10 pentagons
- Edges: 120
- Vertices: 60
- Vertex configuration: 20(3.4^{2}.5); 2×10+20(3.4.5.4)
- Symmetry group: D_{5d}
- Dual polyhedron: -
- Properties: convex, canonical

Net
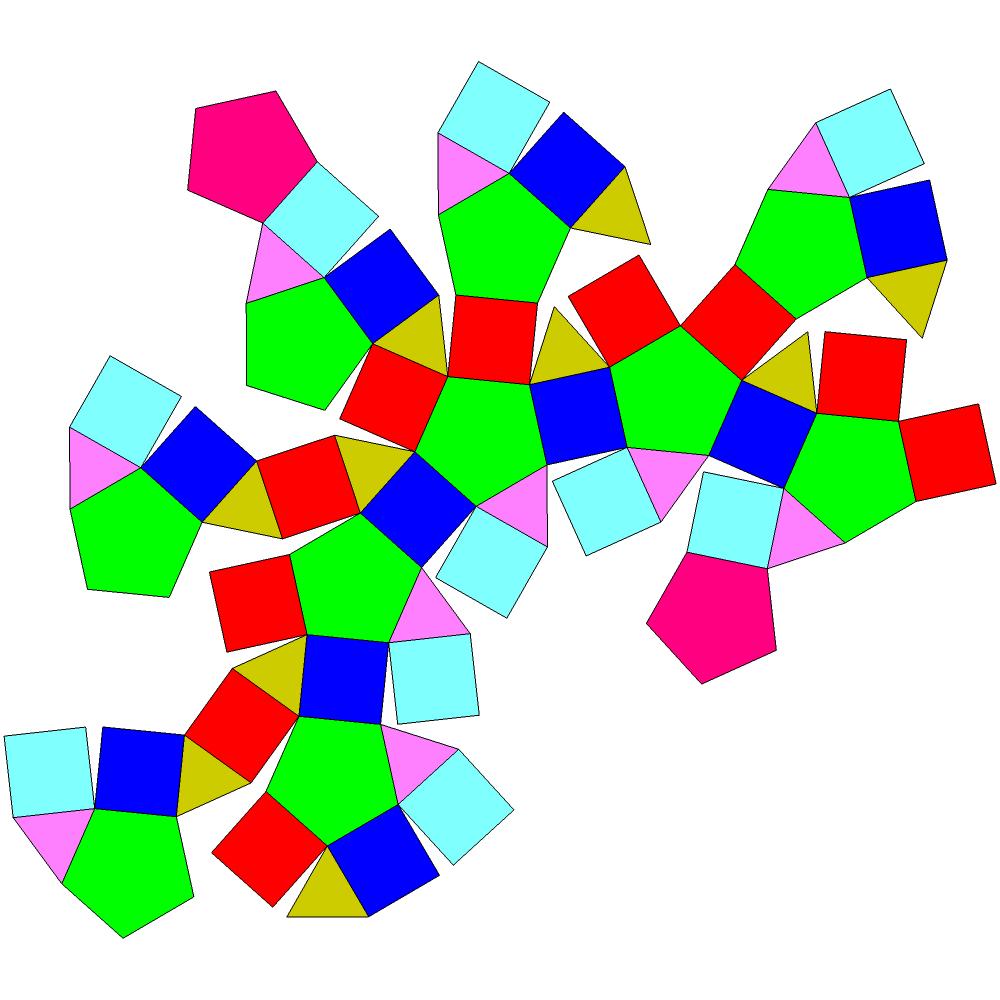

In geometry, the parabigyrate rhombicosidodecahedron is one of the Johnson solids (J_{73}). It can be constructed as a rhombicosidodecahedron with two opposing pentagonal cupolae rotated through 36 degrees. It is also a canonical polyhedron.

3D model of a parabigyrate rhombicosidodecahedron

A Johnson solid is one of 92 strictly convex polyhedra that are composed of regular polygon faces but are not uniform polyhedra (that is, they are not Platonic solids, Archimedean solids, prisms, or antiprisms). They were named by Norman Johnson, who first listed these polyhedra in 1966.

Alternative Johnson solids, constructed by rotating different cupolae of a rhombicosidodecahedron, are:

- The gyrate rhombicosidodecahedron (J_{72}) where only one cupola is rotated;
- The metabigyrate rhombicosidodecahedron (J_{74}) where two non-opposing cupolae are rotated;
- And the trigyrate rhombicosidodecahedron (J_{75}) where three cupolae are rotated.
