= Trigyrate rhombicosidodecahedron =

75th Johnson solid (62 faces)

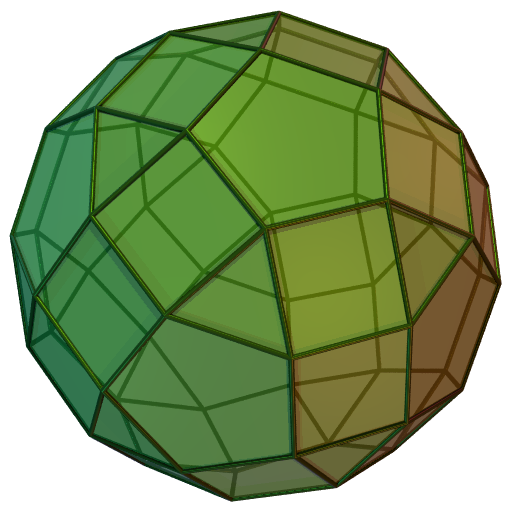
- Type: Johnson; J_{74} – J_{75} – J_{76}
- Faces: 2+2×3+2×6 triangles 4×3+3×6 squares 4×3 pentagons
- Edges: 120
- Vertices: 60
- Vertex configuration: 5×6(3.4^{2}.5); 4×3+3×6(3.4.5.4)
- Symmetry group: C_{3v}
- Dual polyhedron: -
- Properties: convex, canonical

Net
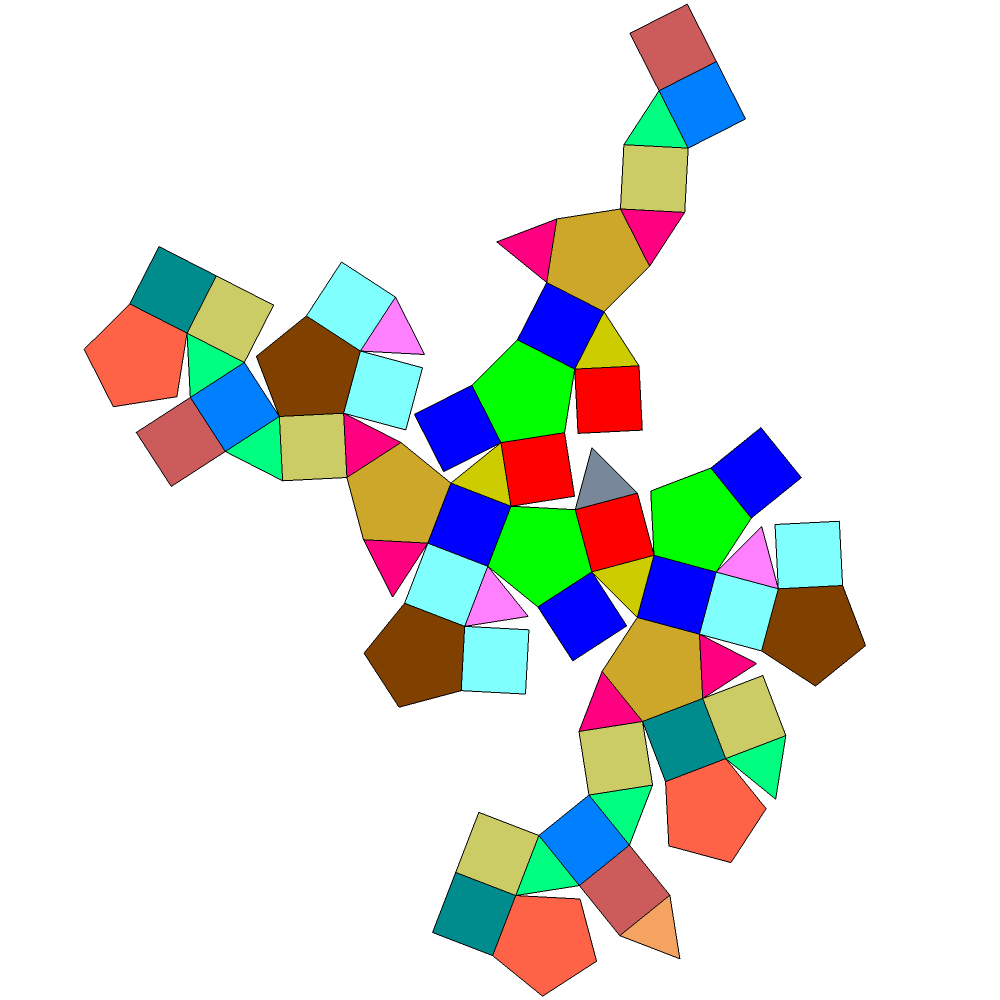

3D model of a trigyrate rhombicosidodecahedron

In geometry, the trigyrate rhombicosidodecahedron is one of the Johnson solids (J_{75}). It contains 20 triangles, 30 squares and 12 pentagons. It is also a canonical polyhedron.

A Johnson solid is one of 92 strictly convex polyhedra that are composed of regular polygon faces but are not uniform polyhedra (that is, they are not Platonic solids, Archimedean solids, prisms, or antiprisms). They were named by Norman Johnson, who first listed these polyhedra in 1966.

It can be constructed as a rhombicosidodecahedron with three pentagonal cupolae rotated through 36 degrees. Related Johnson solids are:

- The gyrate rhombicosidodecahedron (J_{72}) where one cupola is rotated;
- The parabigyrate rhombicosidodecahedron (J_{73}) where two opposing cupolae are rotated;
- And the metabigyrate rhombicosidodecahedron (J_{74}) where two non-opposing cupolae are rotated.
