= Double Planetoid =

Escher print of a stellated octahedron shaped planetoid

Double Planetoid by M. C. Escher, 1949

Double Planetoid is a wood engraving print by the Dutch artist M. C. Escher, first printed in 1949.

== Description ==
Double Planetoid is printed in four colors from four wood blocks. It depicts a planetoid in the shape of a compound of two tetrahedra, interpenetrating each other to form a stellated octahedron. One of the two tetrahedra is entirely covered by architecture, while the other is a wilderness populated by saurian creatures. The planetoid is shown within a circular black field, 37.5 centimetres (14.8 in) in diameter.

== Themes ==
Double Planetoid is part of a series of Escher's prints from the 1940s and 1950s that depict small polyhedral planets, also including Gravitation (1952) and Tetrahedral Planetoid (1954), and possibly in the same universe as his print Stars (1948). It has thematic connections with other Escher prints from the same period that provide simultaneous views of intermingled worlds, including the more realistic prints Puddle (1952) and Three Worlds (1955), and is one of many Escher works using the geometry of polyhedra and polyhedral compounds.

== Collections ==
Copies of the print are included in the permanent collections of the National Gallery of Canada, the US National Gallery of Art, and the Museum of Fine Arts, Boston.

== See also ==
- Tetrahedral hypothesis, the discredited scientific theory that the arrangement of the Earth's continents comes from the geometry of a tetrahedron
