= Kepler–Poinsot polyhedron =

Any of 4 regular star polyhedra

Great dodecahedron

Small stellated dodecahedron

Great icosahedron

Great stellated dodecahedron

In geometry, a Kepler–Poinsot polyhedron is any of four regular star polyhedra.

They may be obtained by stellating and faceting the regular convex dodecahedron and icosahedron, and differ from these in having regular pentagrammic faces or vertex figures. They can all be seen as three-dimensional analogues of the pentagram in one way or another.

== Characteristics ==
The Kepler–Poinsot polyhedra are the regular star polyhedra, obtained by extending both regular icosahedron and regular dodecahedron, an operation named stellation. This operation results in four different polyhedra:

- Great dodecahedron: constructed from attaching twelve pentagonal pyramids (with regular polygonal faces) onto the face of a regular dodecahedron, and attached again with thirty wedges. However, this can be constructed alternatively by removing the polygonal faces without changing or creating new vertices of a regular icosahedron.
- Small stellated dodecahedron: attaching twelve pentagonal pyramids onto a regular dodecahedron's faces. Topologically, this shares the same surface as the pentakis dodecahedron.
- Great icosahedron; and
- Great stellated dodecahedron: constructed from a great dodecahedron with twenty asymmetric triangular bipyramids, attaching to the hollow between the wedges.

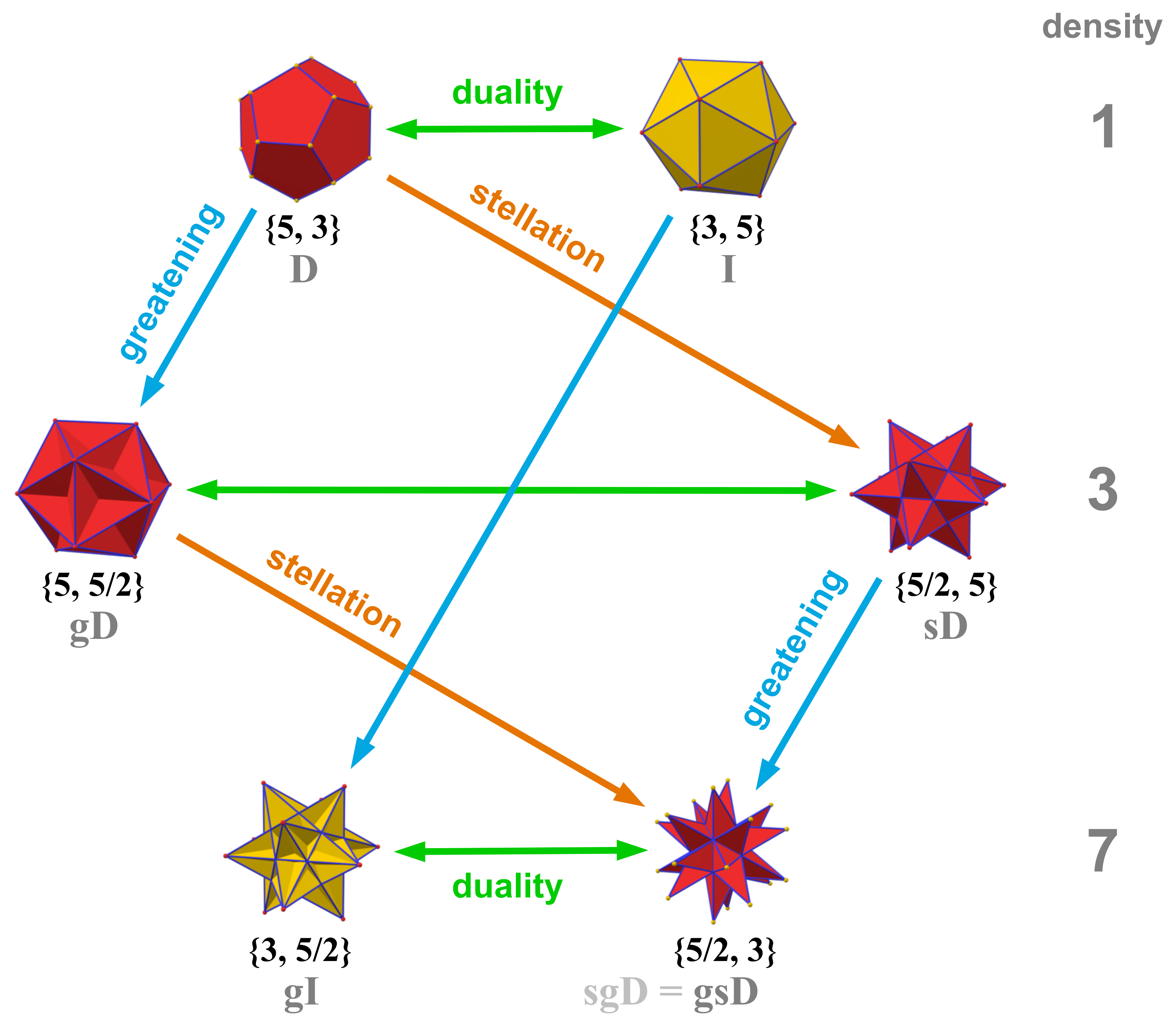
Conway's system of relations between the six polyhedra (ordered vertically by density). Duality connection Greatening (g) connection Stellation (s) connection

John Conway introduces operators for the Kepler–Poinsot polyhedra known as greatenings—(g), maintaining the type of faces, shifting and resizing them into parallel planes—and stellations—(s), changing pentagonal faces into pentagrams—of the convex solids. In his naming convention, the small stellated dodecahedron is just the stellated dodecahedron.

By the construction above, these figures have pentagrams (star pentagons) as faces or vertex figures. The dual polyhedron of a great dodecahedron is the small stellated dodecahedron, and the dual of a great icosahedron is the great stellated dodecahedron. The four share the symmetry as both regular icosahedron and regular dodecahedron, the icosahedral symmetry.

=== Euler characteristic ===
A Kepler–Poinsot polyhedron covers its circumscribed sphere more than once, with the centers of faces acting as winding points in the figures which have pentagrammic faces, and the vertices in the others. Because of this, they are not necessarily topologically equivalent to the sphere as Platonic solids are, and in particular, the Euler relation
$$\chi=V-E+F=2\$$
does not always hold. Schläfli held that all polyhedra must have χ = 2, and he rejected the small stellated dodecahedron and great dodecahedron as proper polyhedra. This view was never widely held.

A modified form of Euler's formula, using density (D) of the vertex figures (d_{v}) and faces (d_{f}) was given by Arthur Cayley, and holds both for convex polyhedra (where the correction factors are all 1), and the Kepler–Poinsot polyhedra:
$$d_v V - E + d_f F = 2D,$$
and by this calculation, the density of the great icosahedron and the great stellated dodecahedron are 7, whereas the great dodecahedron and the small stellated dodecahedron are 3.

=== Duality and Petrie polygons ===
The Kepler–Poinsot polyhedra exist in dual pairs. Duals have the same Petrie polygon, or more precisely, Petrie polygons with the same two-dimensional projection.

The following images show the two dual compounds with the same edge radius. They also show that the Petrie polygons are skew. Two relationships described in the article below are also easily seen in the images: That the violet edges are the same, and that the green faces lie in the same planes.

horizontal edge in front	vertical edge in front	Petrie polygon
small stellated dodecahedron $\left\{\frac{5}{2}, 5\right\}$	great dodecahedron $\left\{5, \frac{5}{2}\right\}$	hexagon $\left\{\frac{6}{1,3}\right\}$
great icosahedron $\left\{3, \frac{5}{2}\right\}$	great stellated dodecahedron $\left\{\frac{5}{2}, 3\right\}$	decagram $\left\{\frac{10}{3,5}\right\}$

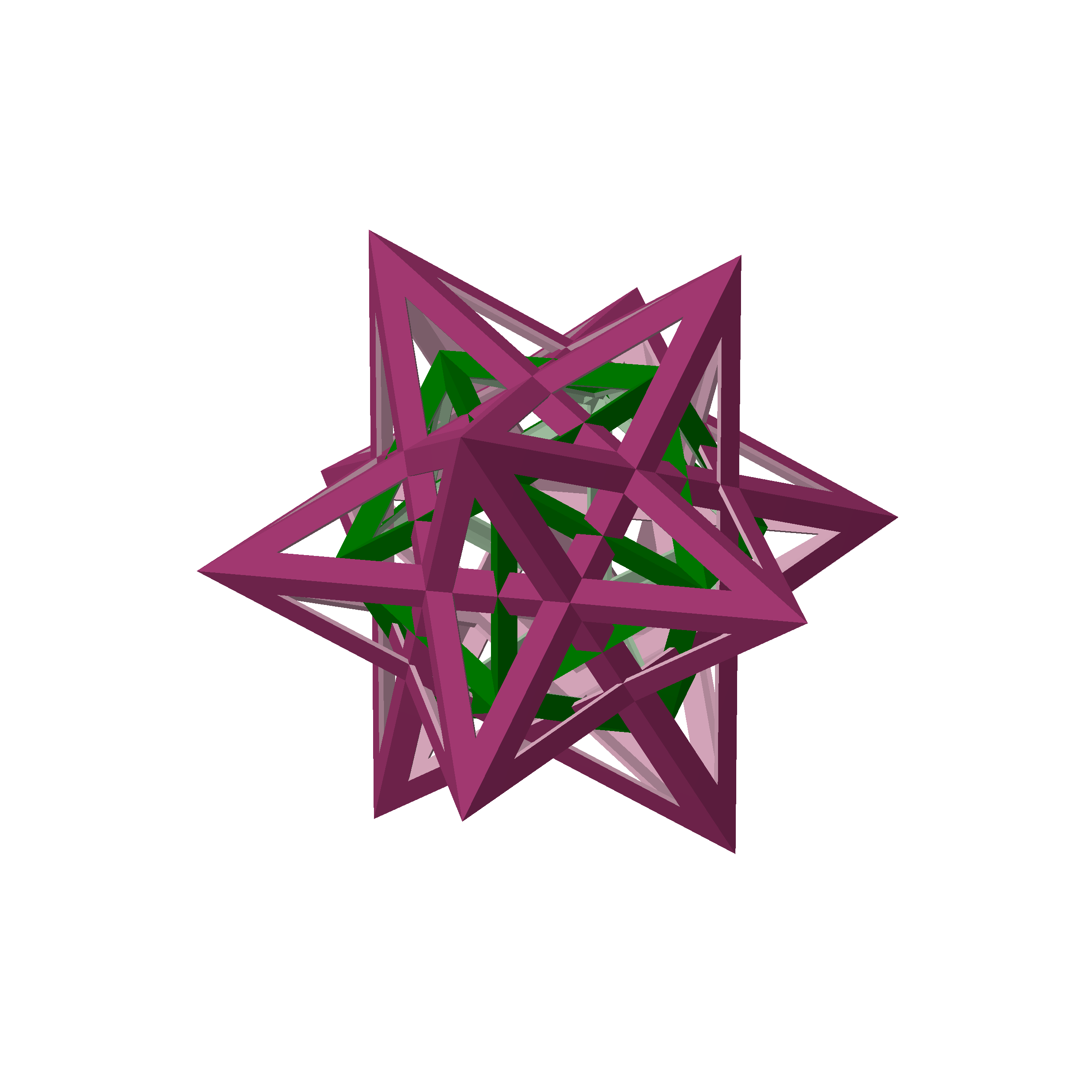
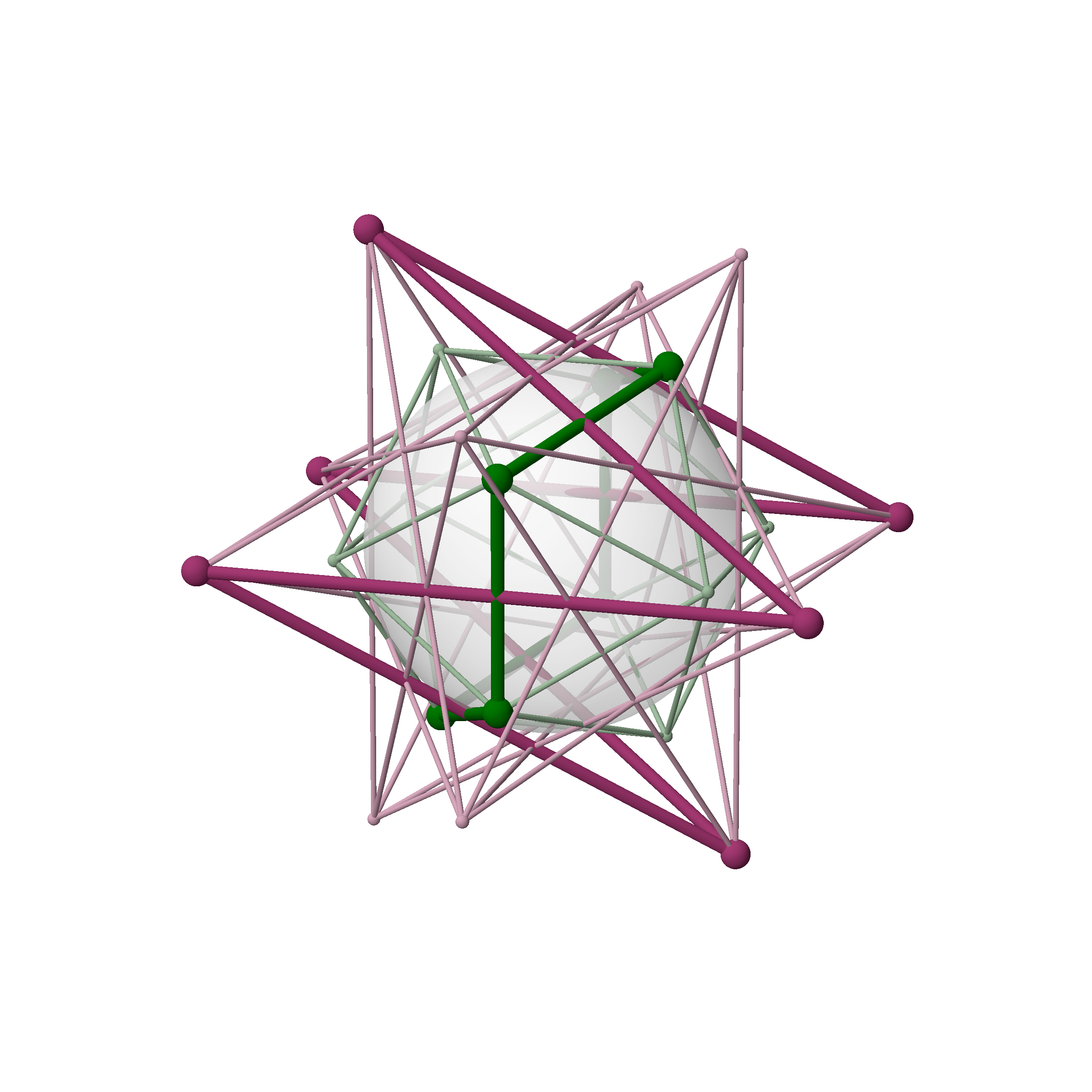
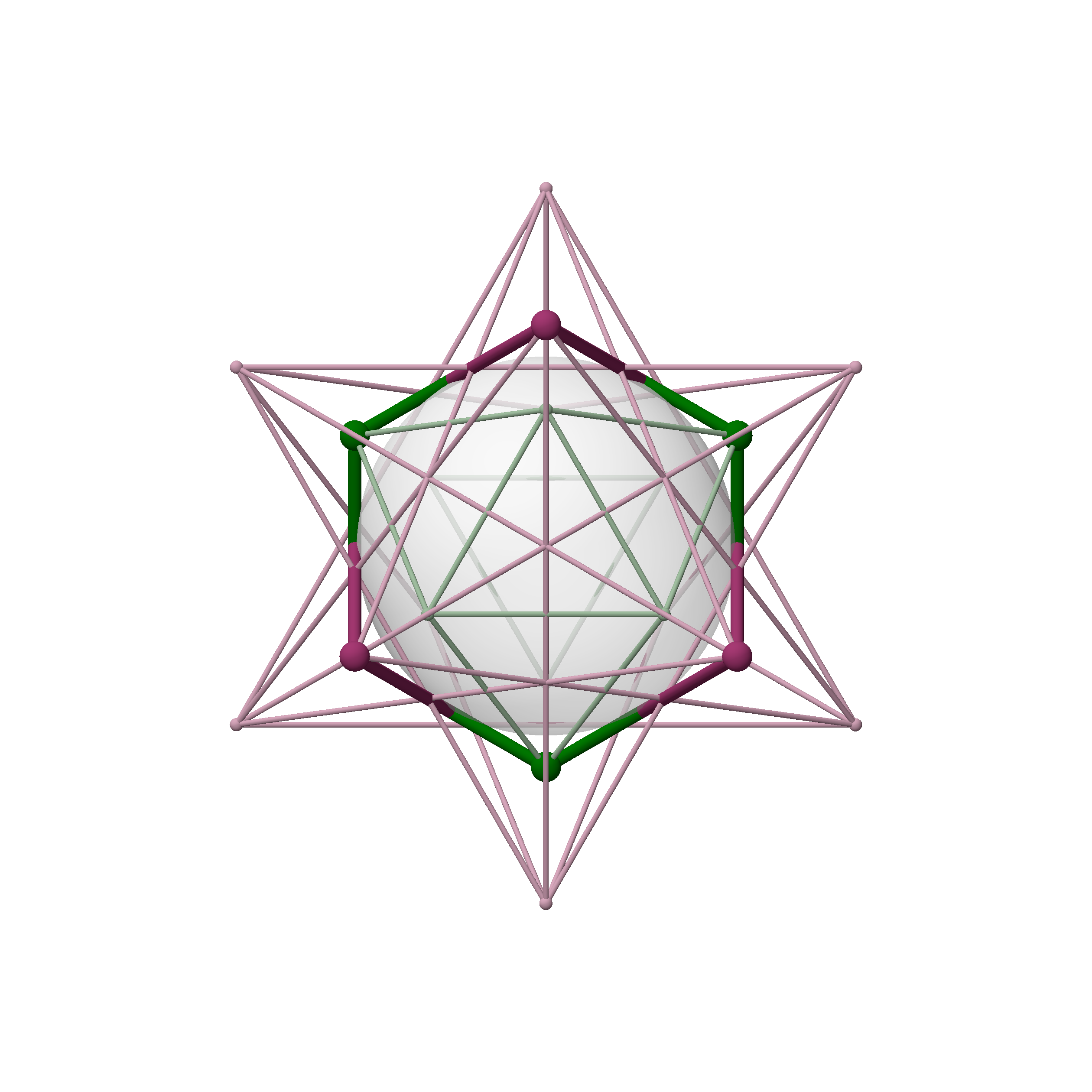
Compound of sD and gD with Petrie hexagons

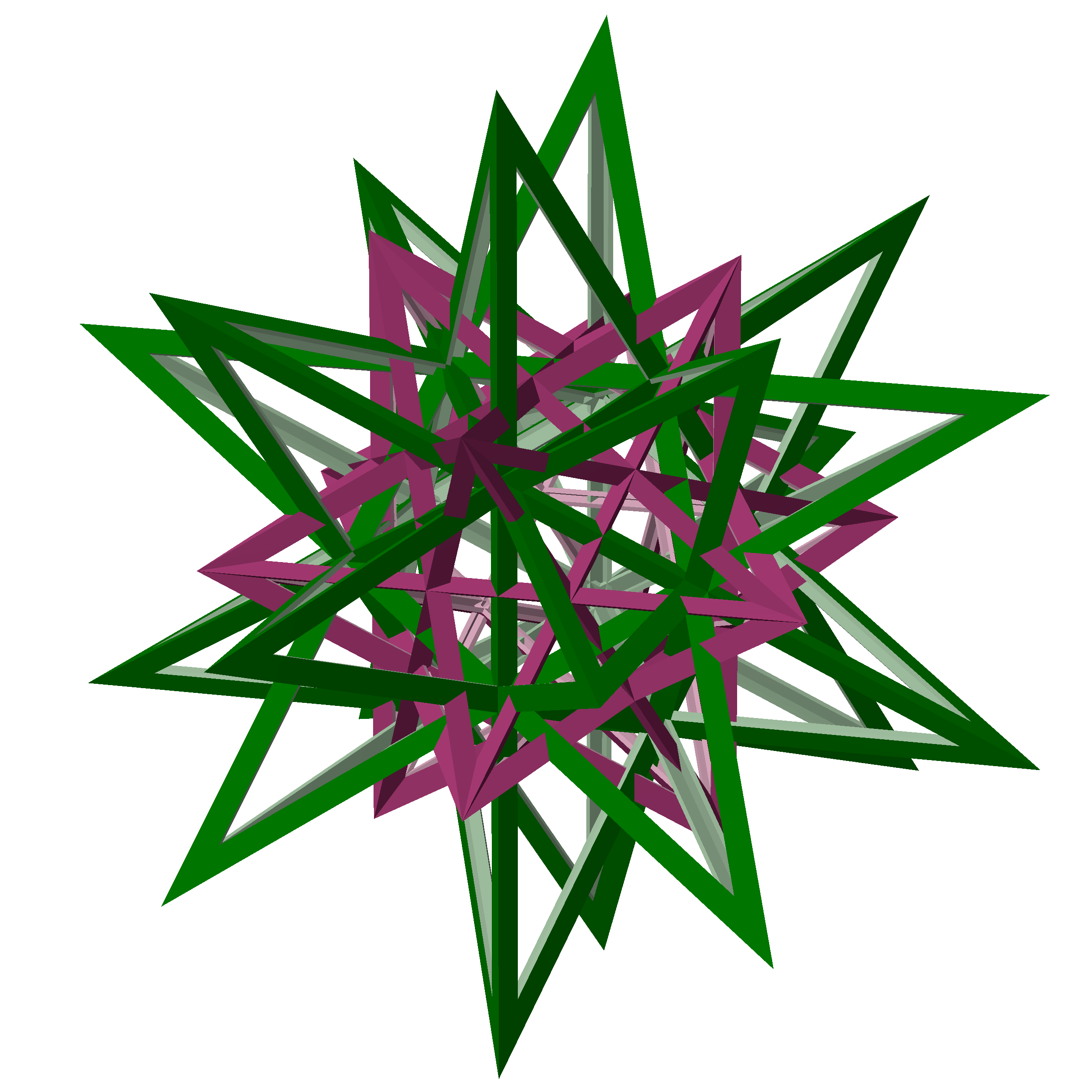
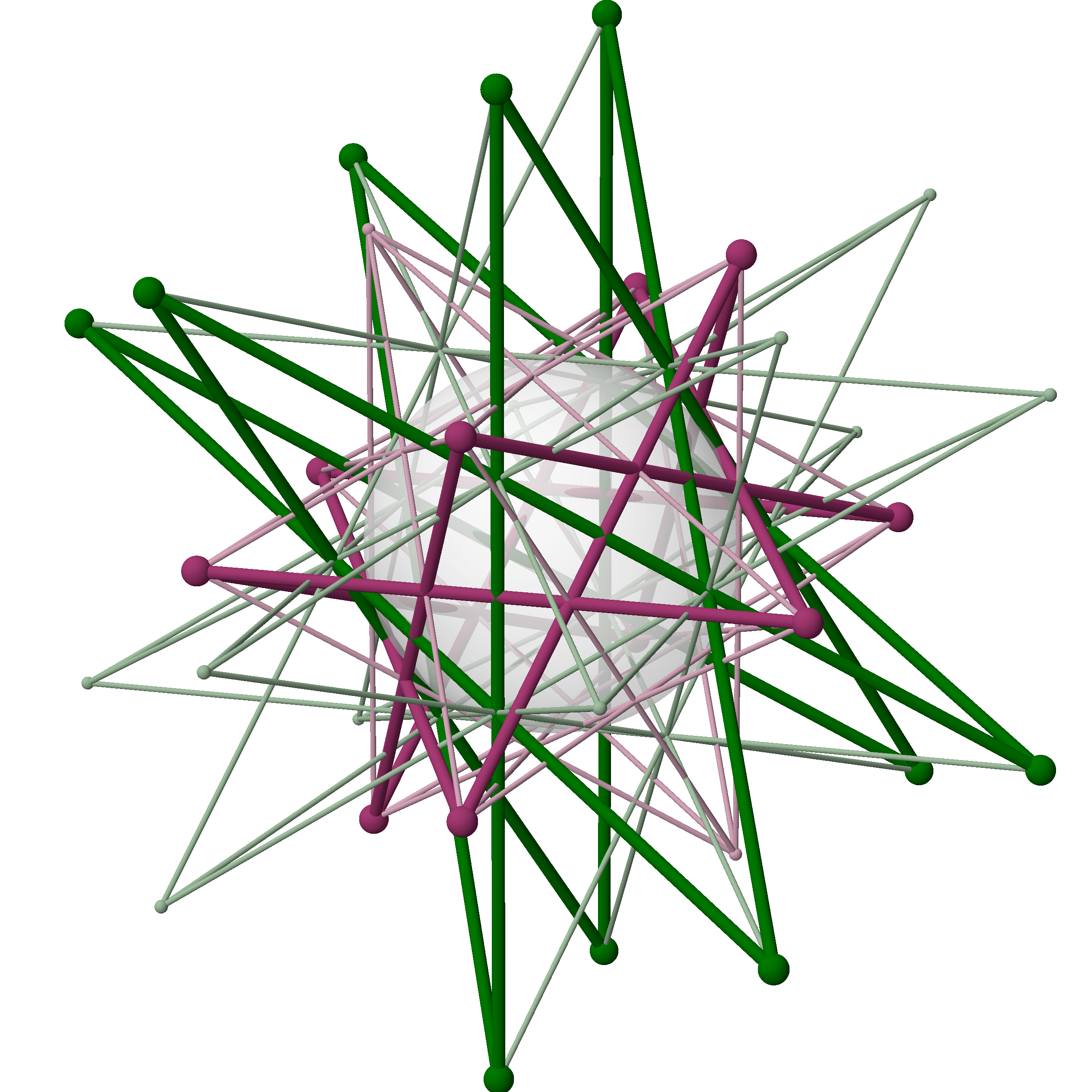
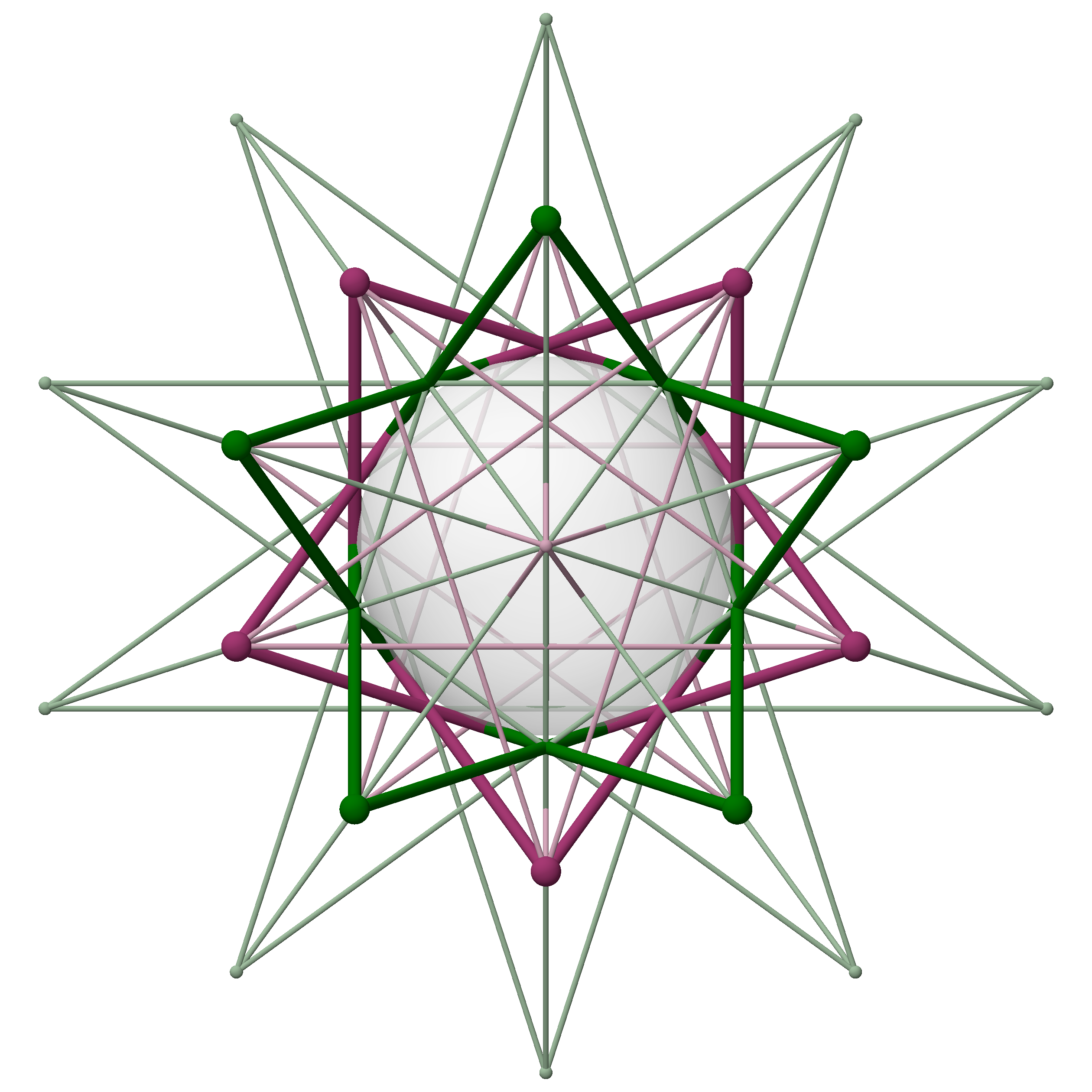
Compound of gI and gsD with Petrie decagrams

=== Summary ===
Name (Conway's abbreviation)	Picture	Spherical tiling	Stellation diagram	Schläfli {p,q} and Coxeter-Dynkin	Faces {p}	Edges	Vertices {q}	Vertex figure (config.)	Petrie polygon	χ	Density	Symmetry	Dual
great dodecahedron (gD)				{5, 5/2}	12 {5}	30	12 {5/2}	(5^{5})/2	{6}	−6	3	I_{h}	small stellated dodecahedron
small stellated dodecahedron (sD)				{5/2, 5}	12 {5/2}	30	12 {5}	(5/2)^{5}	{6}	−6	3	I_{h}	great dodecahedron
great icosahedron (gI)				{3, 5/2}	20 {3}	30	12 {5/2}	(3^{5})/2	{10/3}	2	7	I_{h}	great stellated dodecahedron
great stellated dodecahedron (sgD = gsD)				{5/2, 3}	12 {5/2}	30	20 {3}	(5/2)^{3}	{10/3}	2	7	I_{h}	great icosahedron

== History ==
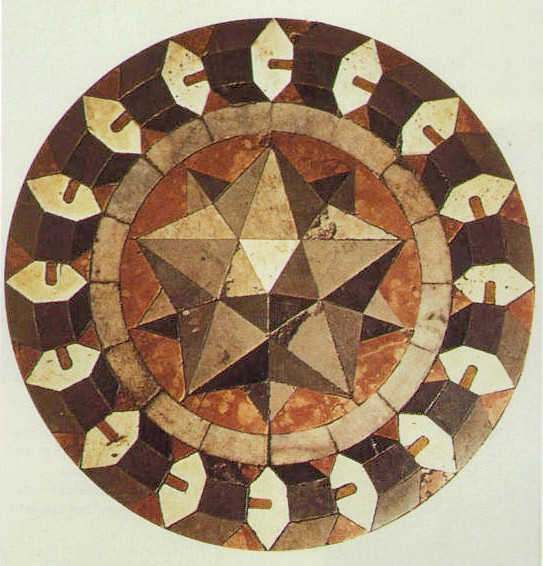
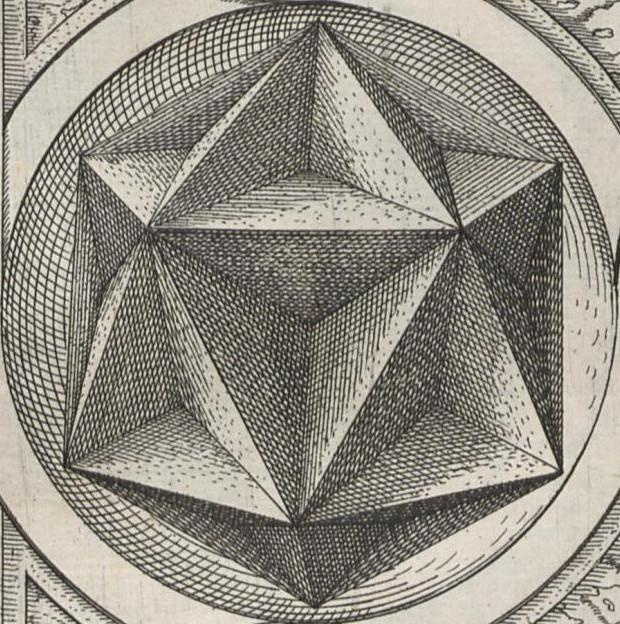
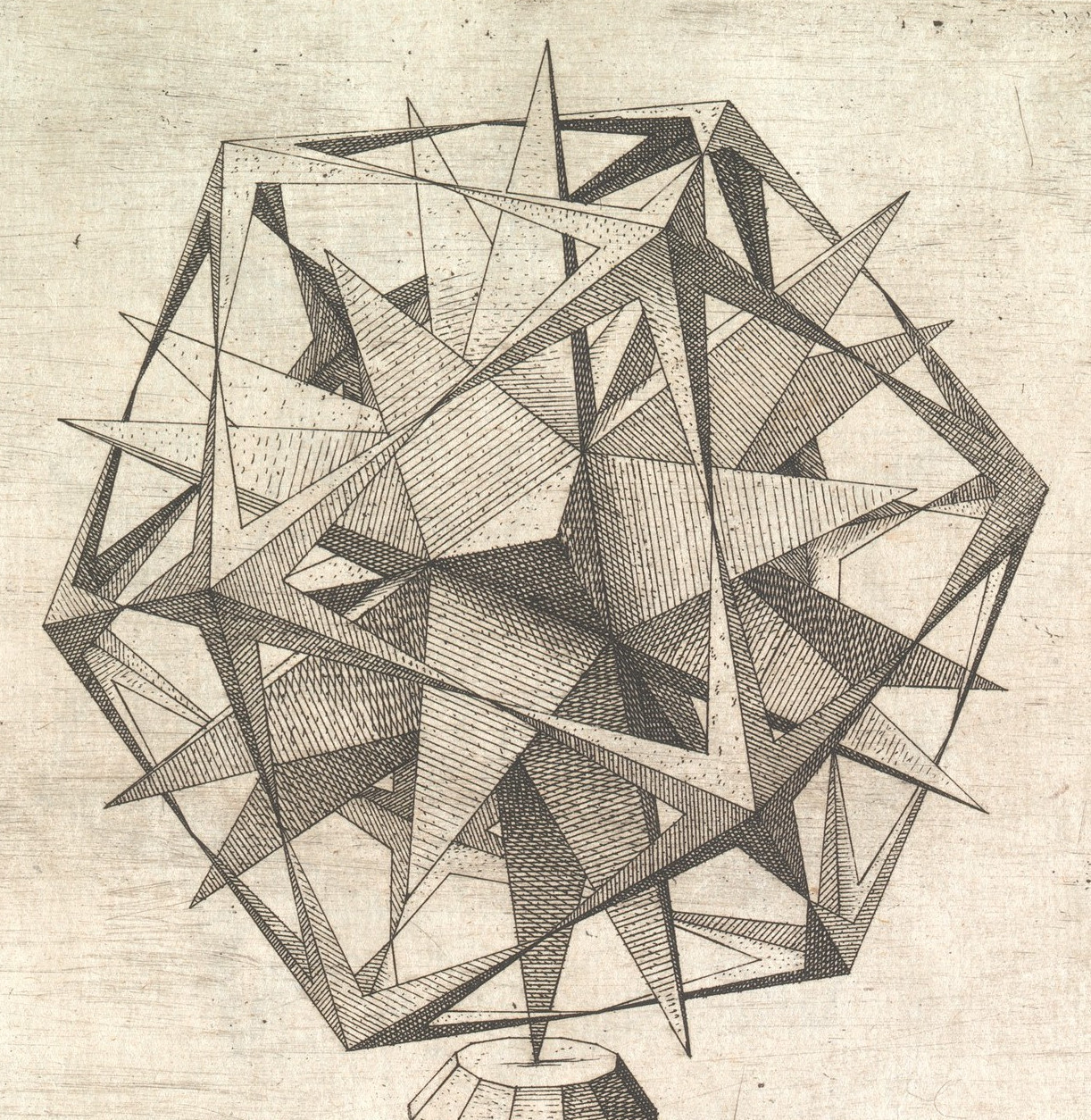
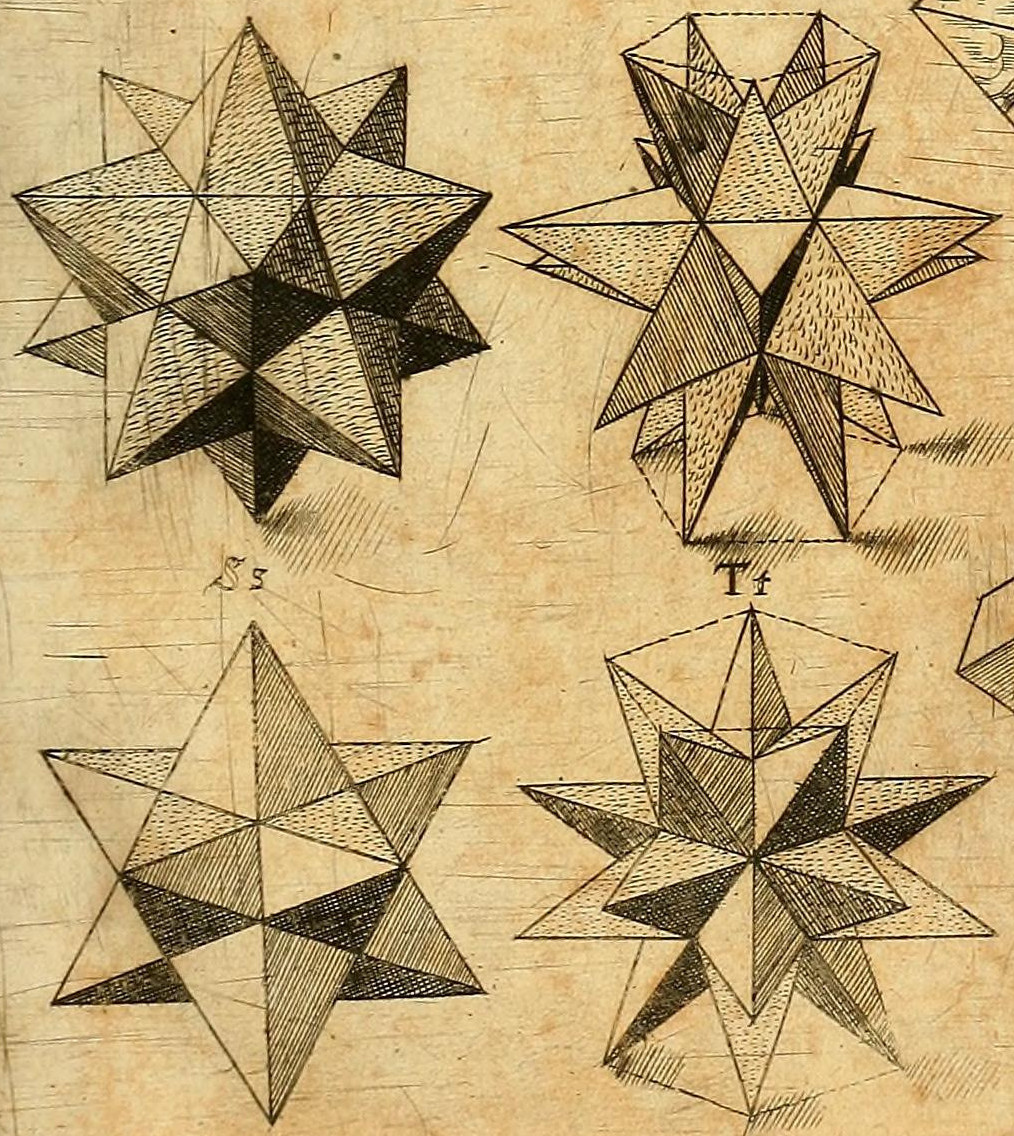
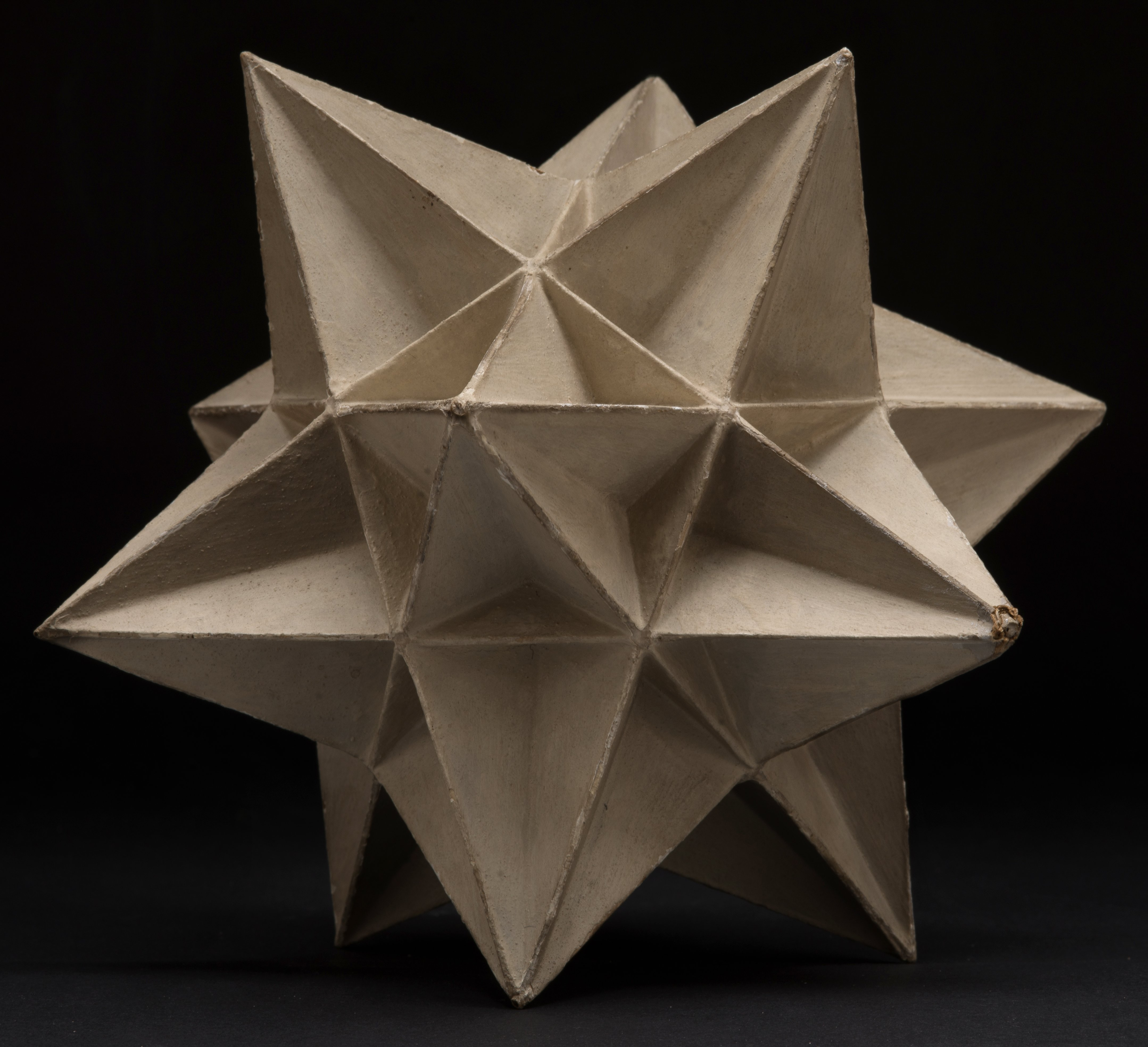

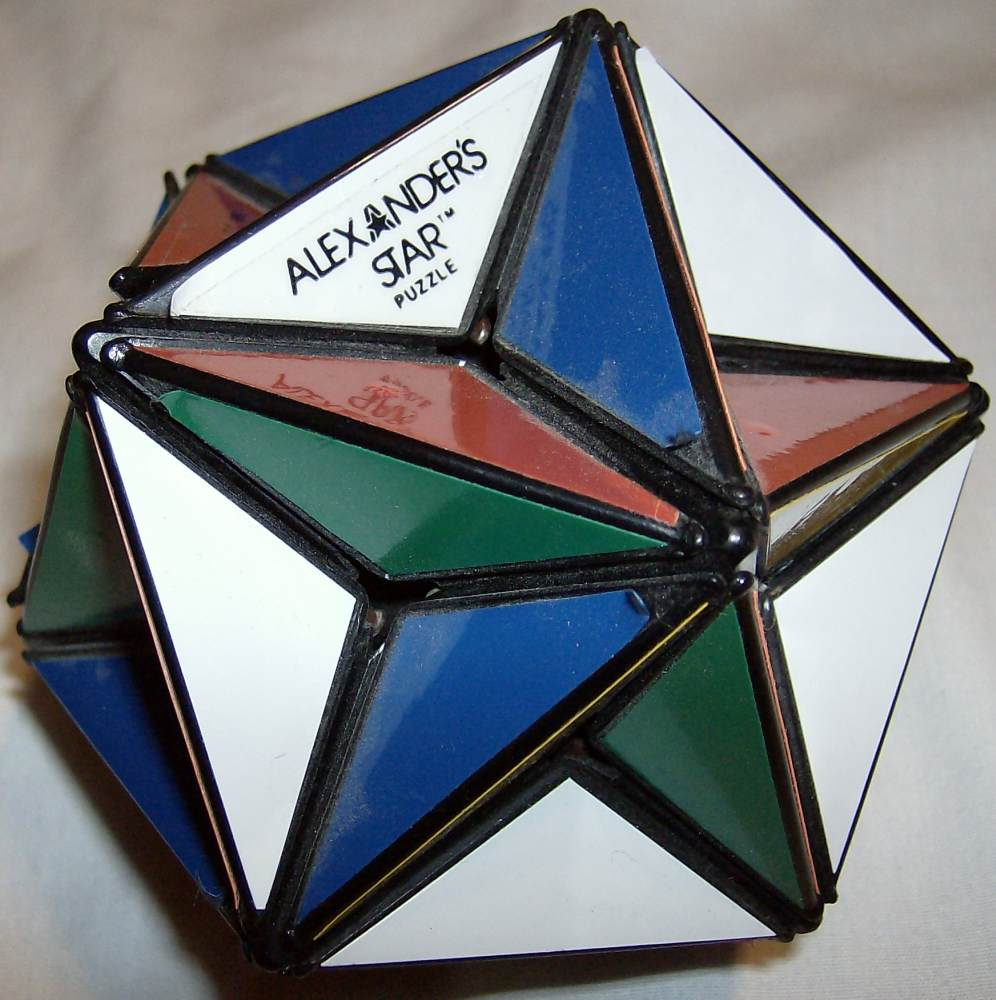
Alexander's Star

Top left to bottom right: floor mosaic in St Mark's, Venice, possibly by Paolo Uccello; great dodecahedron and great stellated dodecahedron in Perspectiva Corporum Regularium (1568); stellated dodecahedra, Harmonices Mundi by Johannes Kepler (1619); cardboard model of a great icosahedron from Tübingen University (around 1860); and the Alexander's Star.

Most, if not all, of the Kepler–Poinsot polyhedra were known of in some form or other before Kepler. A small stellated dodecahedron appears in a marble tarsia (inlay panel) on the floor of St. Mark's Basilica, Venice, Italy. It dates from the 15th century and is sometimes attributed to Paolo Uccello.

In his Perspectiva corporum regularium, a book of woodcuts published in 1568, Wenzel Jamnitzer depicts the great stellated dodecahedron and a great dodecahedron. It is clear from the general arrangement of the book that he regarded only the five Platonic solids as regular.

The small and great stellated dodecahedra, sometimes called the Kepler polyhedra, were first recognized as regular by Johannes Kepler around 1619. He obtained them by stellating the regular convex dodecahedron, for the first time treating it as a surface rather than a solid. He noticed that by extending the edges or faces of the convex dodecahedron until they met again, he could obtain star pentagons. Further, he recognized that these star pentagons are also regular. In this way, he constructed the two stellated dodecahedra. Each has the central convex region of each face "hidden" within the interior, with only the triangular arms visible. Kepler's final step was to recognize that these polyhedra fit the definition of regularity, even though they were not convex, as the traditional Platonic solids were.

In 1809, Louis Poinsot rediscovered Kepler's figures by assembling star pentagons around each vertex. He also assembled convex polygons around star vertices to discover two more regular stars, the great icosahedron and great dodecahedron. Some people call these two the Poinsot polyhedra. Poinsot did not know if he had discovered all the regular star polyhedra. Three years later, Augustin Cauchy proved the list complete by stellating the Platonic solids, and almost half a century after that, in 1858, Bertrand provided a more elegant proof by faceting them. The following year, Arthur Cayley gave the Kepler–Poinsot polyhedra the names by which they are generally known today. A hundred years later, John Conway developed a systematic terminology for stellations in up to four dimensions. Within this scheme, the small stellated dodecahedron is just the stellated dodecahedron.

Artist M. C. Escher's interest in geometric forms often led to works based on or including regular solids; Gravitation is based on a small stellated dodecahedron. A dissection of the great dodecahedron was used for the 1980s puzzle Alexander's Star. Norwegian artist Vebjørn Sand's sculpture The Kepler Star is displayed near Oslo Airport, Gardermoen. The star spans 14 meters and consists of both a regular icosahedron and a regular dodecahedron inside a great stellated dodecahedron.

== See also ==
- Regular polytope
- Regular polyhedron
- List of regular polytopes
- Uniform polyhedron
- Uniform star polyhedron
- Polyhedral compound
- Regular star 4-polytope – the ten regular star 4-polytopes, 4-dimensional analogues of the Kepler–Poinsot polyhedra
