= Stellated octahedron =

Two tetrahedra crossing each other

- Stellated octahedron, made from a red and a green tetrahedron crossing each other
- Type: Regular compound Polyhedral compound UC_{4} W_{19}
- Faces: 8 triangles
- Edges: 12
- Vertices: 8
- Coxeter diagram: {4,3}[2{3,3}]{3,4}
- Symmetry group: octahedral symmetry
- Dual polyhedron: self-dual

The stellated octahedron, elevated octahedron, or compound of two tetrahedra is a shape made from two regular tetrahedra crossing each other. It is also called the stella octangula (Latin for "eight-pointed star"), a name given to it by Johannes Kepler in 1609, though it was known to earlier geometers. It appears as a carving in a 13th century Turkish caravanserai, and in modern architectural decorations; it has been depicted by Leonardo da Vinci in Pacioli's 1509 De Divina Proportione, and in the works of M. C. Escher.

The two tetrahedra of this shape form the simplest of the five regular polyhedral compounds, and the only regular polyhedral compound composed of only two polyhedra. They form the only fully symmetric stellation of the octahedron, and dually the only fully symmetric faceting of the cube. The combinatorial structure of this shape has been considered in multiple variations; these vary by whether the triangular faces of the two crossing tetrahedra are considered as faces themselves or whether they are subdivided into smaller triangular faces, and by whether interior boundaries or only the outer shell are included.

The stella octangula numbers are figurate numbers defined from the stellated octahedron. The two tetrahedra of a stellated octahedron can be extended to form a desmic system of three tetrahedra whose edges, extended to projective lines, each cross four other such lines. The stellated octahedron is the second stage of construction of a geode-like three-dimensional fractal within a cube, analogous to the two-dimensional Koch snowflake. The stellated octahedron can be generalized to compounds of two centrally symmetric simplices in any dimension, forming a family of shapes that also includes the two-dimensional hexagram or Star of David. Applications of the stellated octahedron include the fabrication of nanoparticles with distinctive electromagnetic and biological properties, the theoretical understanding of quantum entanglement, and the design of four-bar linkages and auxetic metamaterials.

== Construction and properties ==
The stellated octahedron can be constructed in multiple different ways, including as a stellation, as a compound polyhedron, as a faceting, and as an augmentation.

=== Stellation ===
Stellation diagram of a stellated octahedron

The stellated octahedron is constructed by a stellation of the regular octahedron. In a stellation, the faces of the underlying polyhedron are extended within the same planes to enclose a different volume. It is generally required that the result maintain the same symmetry as the underlying polyhedron, and with this restriction the stellated octahedron is the only stellation of the octahedron. Here, the extension in each plane consists of three equilateral triangles, surrounding the original triangular face of the octahedron and having the same size as it. These three triangles and the fourth triangle that they surround together form a larger equilateral triangle, and when constructed in this way, the stellated octahedron has eight of these larger equilateral triangle faces, crossing each other.

Some versions of stellation also take the further step of removing parts of the extended faces to produce a polyhedral surface without self-crossings or interior voids. For these versions, there are again eight faces, one in each plane, but each face takes the shape of an equilateral triangle with a hole formed by the removal of its midpoint triangle. This is shown in its stellation diagram, which depicts the plane of a single extended face and shades the outer boundary of the stellation within that plane.

=== Compound ===
The stellated octahedron is also a regular polyhedron compound. Here, a compound is a system of two or more polyhedra, and being regular means that it has symmetries that take every two vertices to each other, that take every two edges to each other, and that take every two faces to each other. The stellated compound is a compound of two regular tetrahedra, related to each other by a central symmetry through the centroid of each tetrahedron. Hence, the stellated octahedron is also called the compound of two tetrahedra.

Both tetrahedra can be inscribed in a cube, and each one shares four vertices with the cube. The two tetrahedra share a common midsphere, making the compound self-dual. The regular octahedron whose stellation forms this compound can be recovered as the intersection of the two tetrahedra. This compound is related to several others: stellating the compound of five octahedra produces five stellated octahedra that together form the compound of ten tetrahedra, and selecting one tetrahedron from each of these five stellated octahedra produces the compound of five tetrahedra.

If the edges of two congruent tetrahedra are arranged in this configuration, it is possible to slide the two tetrahedra against each other, to less symmetric configurations, in such a way that each pair of crossing edges remains coplanar. The relative positions of the two tetrahedra that can be reached in this way form a system of one- and two-dimensional smooth manifolds within the six-dimensional configuration space of positions of one tetrahedron relative to the other.

=== Faceting ===
Stellated octahedron as a cube faceting

The stellated octahedron is a faceting of the cube, meaning that it is a polyhedron or compound polyhedron within a cube that uses only the vertices of the cube. Faceting is the dual process to stellation. For the faceting that produces the stellated octahedron, the edges of the faceting are the face diagonals of the cube, and the faces are equilateral triangles connecting the three neighbors of each cube vertex. These vertices, edges, and faces form two tetrahedra, forming the stellated octahedron as a compound of two tetrahedra.

Although the cube can be faceted in multiple ways with lesser symmetry, the stellated octahedron is the only faceting that has the same three-dimensional point group symmetry as the cube, an octahedral symmetry.

=== Augmentation ===
The triakis octahedron, a convex polyhedron with the same combinatorial structure as the outer boundary of the augmented octahedron

A shape with the same surface geometry as the stellated octahedron, but with a different combinatorial face structure, can be obtained as an augmentation of the regular octahedron, by adding tetrahedral pyramids on each face. In this form, the faces of the augmented octahedron are equilateral triangles, of half the side length and one quarter the area of the faces of the corresponding compound of two tetrahedra. The volume of the augmented octahedron is the sum of the volumes of eight tetrahedra and one regular octahedron. For an augmented octahedron with edge length $a$, this gives volume
$$V=8\frac{a^3\sqrt2}{12}+\frac{a^3\sqrt2}{3}=a^3\sqrt2.$$
Equivalently, the volume is 3/2 of the volume of one of the larger tetrahedra forming it as a compound of two tetrahedra, and 1/2 of the volume of the cube in which it is inscribed.

When only the outer faces of the added pyramids are used, this construction produces a non-convex polyhedron with the same combinatorial structure as the convex triakis octahedron, a Catalan solid with much shorter pyramids. Any of these pyramid attachments, convex or non-convex, may be known as the Kleetope of an octahedron. For another choice of pyramid height, intermediate between the triakis octahedron and stellated octahedron, pairs of adjacent triangle faces from different pyramids lie on the same plane, and the shape degenerates to the rhombic dodecahedron.

The outer shell of the augmented octahedron, with 24 equilateral-triangle faces, is an example of a non-convex deltahedron. There are several different ways of arranging the 24 equilateral triangles of this shape into a net, a planar system of polygons from which this deltahedron can be folded. When the faces of the inner octahedron are retained rather than replaced, the resulting structure (the elevation of the octahedron) has 32 equilateral triangles in two shells: the outer augmentation and an inner regular octahedron. Its vertex figure at the inner six vertices takes the form of two nested polygons, a square within an octagon. The undirected graph obtained from the augmented octahedron, with or without its eight inner triangles, has 14 vertices and 36 edges; it has been called the stellated octahedron graph.

As an augmented polyhedron, the stellated octahedron has two dihedral angles between two equilateral triangles, namely a convex and a concave angle, obtained from the angle of a tetrahedron and an octahedron. The stellated octahedron's convex angle is the same as the dihedral angle of a tetrahedron, whereas its concave angle is the sum of two tetrahedra attached to an octahedron. That is,
$$\begin{align}
\arccos\left(\frac{1}{3}\right) &\approx 70.5^\circ, \\
\arccos\left(-\frac{1}{3}\right) + 2 \arccos\left(\frac{1}{3}\right) &\approx 250.5^\circ.
\end{align}$$

== Appearances ==
=== Historical ===
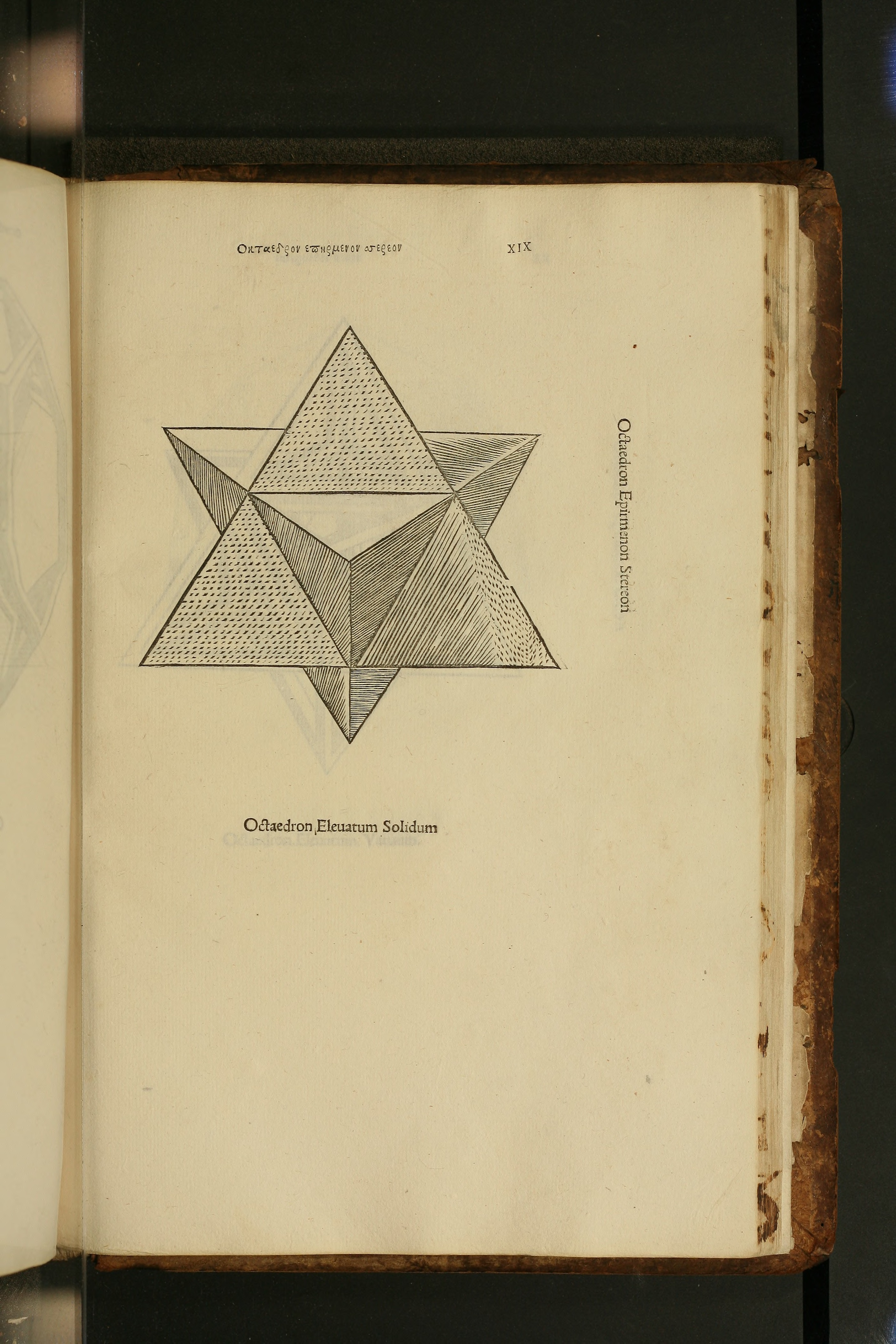
Luca Pacioli 1509's Divina proportione introduced the concept of the elevation by attaching pyramids to an octahedron

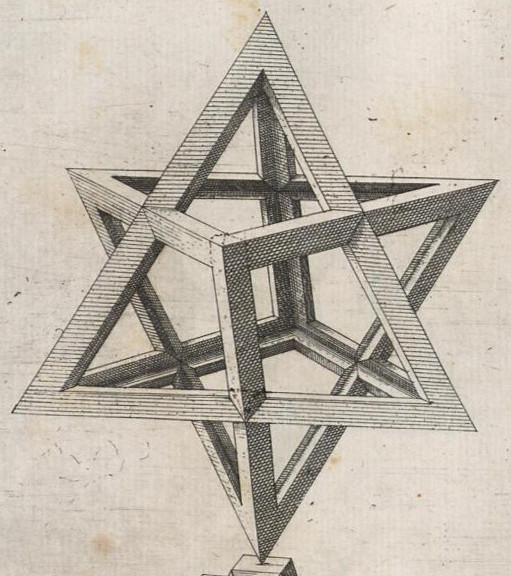
A stellated octahedron in Perspectiva corporum regularium (1568)

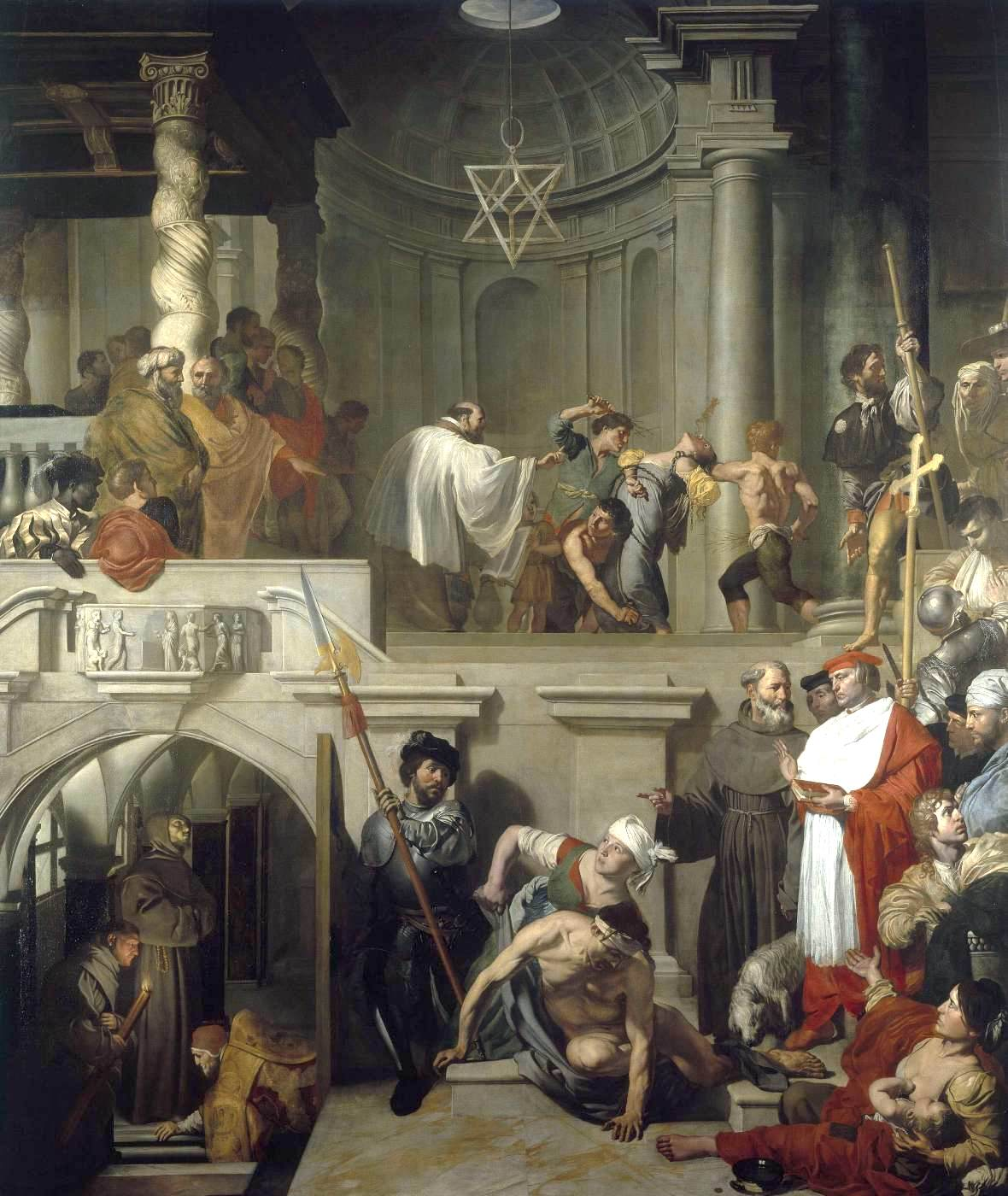
Gérard Douffet, Pope Nicholas V's visit to the tomb of Saint Francis of Assisi (1627)

One of the geometric stone carvings in the Sahib Ata (İshaklı) caravanserai, built in the 13th century in Sultandağı, Turkey, takes the shape of a stellated octahedron.

Luca Pacioli 1509's Divina proportione introduced the concept of the elevation of a polyhedron, formed by replacing each face of the polyhedron by a pyramid. Pacioli describes the elevated octahedron (named by him in Latin, octaedron elevatum) as having two layers of faces, the outer visible layer having 24 equilateral triangles and the hidden inner layer taking the form of an octahedron with another 8 equilateral triangle faces. Leonardo da Vinci's illustration of an elevated regular octahedron for the book takes the form of a stellated octahedron.

The stellated octahedron subsequently appeared in Renaissance books of illustrated polyhedra including Lorenz Stöer's Geometria et Perspectiva (1567), Daniele Barbaro's La pratica della perspettiva (1568), and Wenzel Jamnitzer's Perspectiva corporum regularium (1568). The stellated octahedron was rediscovered as a faceting of the cube by Frans Cophart of the Collegium Musicum in Leiden; Cophart claimed that this was a sixth regular polyhedron, because its 24 faces were both regular and symmetric. Simon Stevin disagreed in his 1583 work Problemata geometrica, noting that Cophart's shape had two kinds of vertices, instead of all vertices being symmetric to each other. Johannes Kepler in his 1609's Harmonice Mundi introduced the concept of stellation, the extension of the faces of one polyhedron within the same planes to form a different polyhedron, and named the stellated octahedron the "stella octangula", Latin for "eight-pointed star".

A 1627 painting by Gérard Douffet, Pope Nicholas V's visit to the tomb of Saint Francis of Assisi, depicts a stellated octahedron hanging from the dome of the church above the tomb, over a scene of an exorcism. Art historian Pierre-Yves Kairis calls out this detail as a "Mannerist oddity".

=== In science and technology ===
3D model of stellated octahedron

Researchers have used various methods to fabricate nanoparticles of gold and palladium with the "octopod" shape of a stellated octahedron. The pointed shapes of these particles give them distinctive electromagnetic and biological properties.

The stellated octahedron has also been used in quantum mechanics. The Bell states of two qubits can be modeled as the four vertices of a tetrahedron, consisting of all possible states of the two qubits. A "Peres transformation", the reflection of this tetrahedron, forms a second tetrahedron, crossing the first one to form a stellated octahedron, within which the central octahedron formed by the intersection of the two tetrahedra forms the set of Bell-diagonal separable states.

In the design of mechanical linkages, the design space of a planar four-bar linkage can be studied by normalizing the length of a fixed bar to one, and defining parameters for the lengths of the other three bars. The tangents of the angles made at the two ends of the fixed bar are then related by a quartic equation whose coefficients involve pairwise products of eight linear combinations of the length parameters. The eight planes in the parameter space where these eight combinations become zero form the faces of a stellated octahedron. A similar analysis, producing a shape resembling a stellated octahedron but with curved surfaces, applies to spherical four-bar linkages.

Tanaka et al have investigated auxetic metamaterials in which stretching the material in one direction does not necessarily cause compression in perpendicular directions, obtained by repeating a three-dimensional grid of unit cells, each taking the form of a stellated octahedron whose eight rigid tetrahedra are connected to some but not all neighboring tetrahedra at hinged joints.

Investigation of granular materials with particles in the shape of stellated octahedra found them to have an angle of repose intermediate between the shallower angles of convex particles with a shape closer to spheres and the steeper angles of tetrahedra and more extremely non-convex caltrop-shaped particles.

=== In popular culture ===
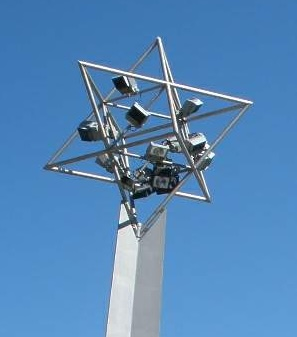
One of the stellated octahedra in the Plaza de Europa, Zaragoza, Spain

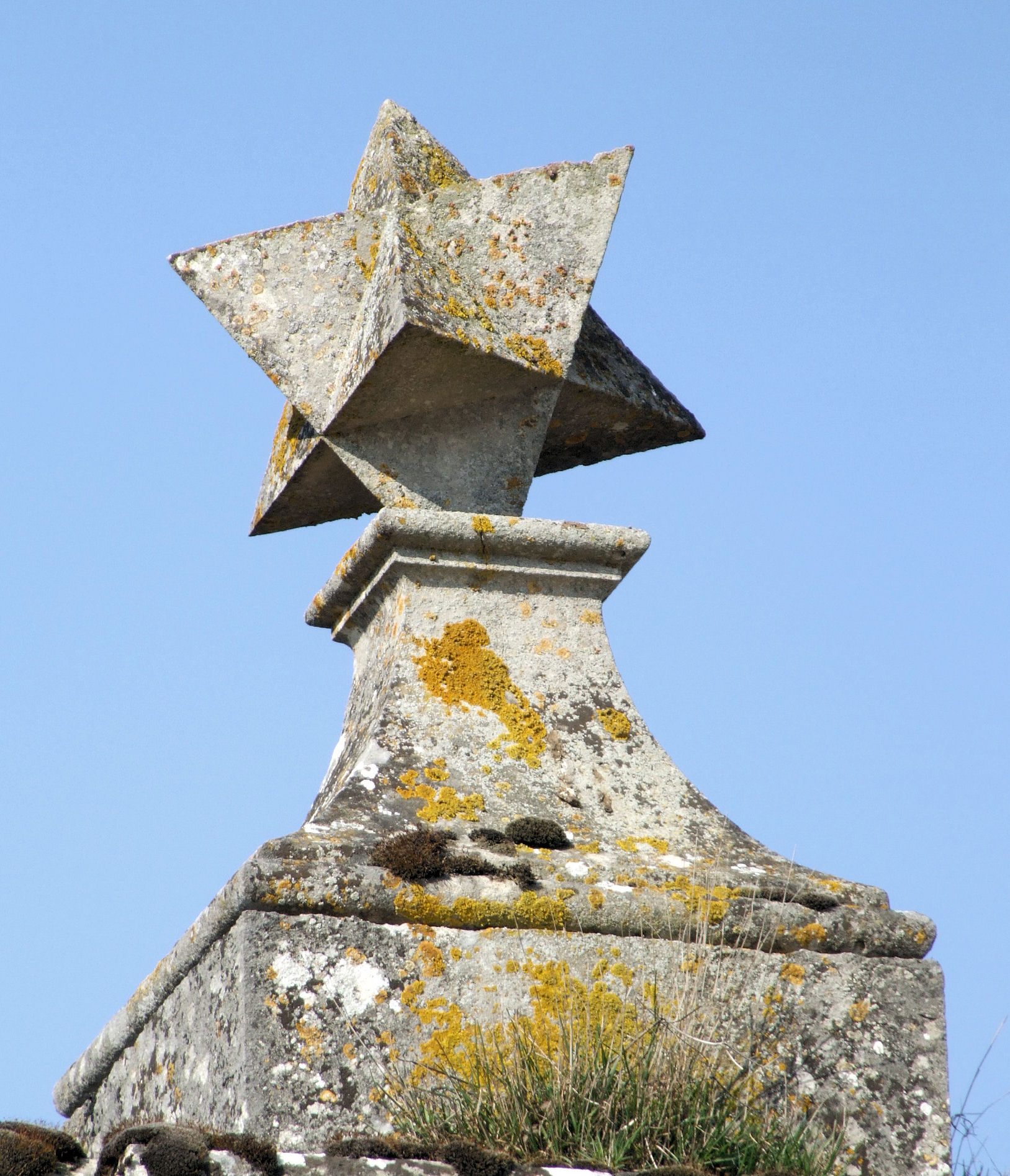
Entrance detail, Abbaye de Jovilliers in Stainville, France

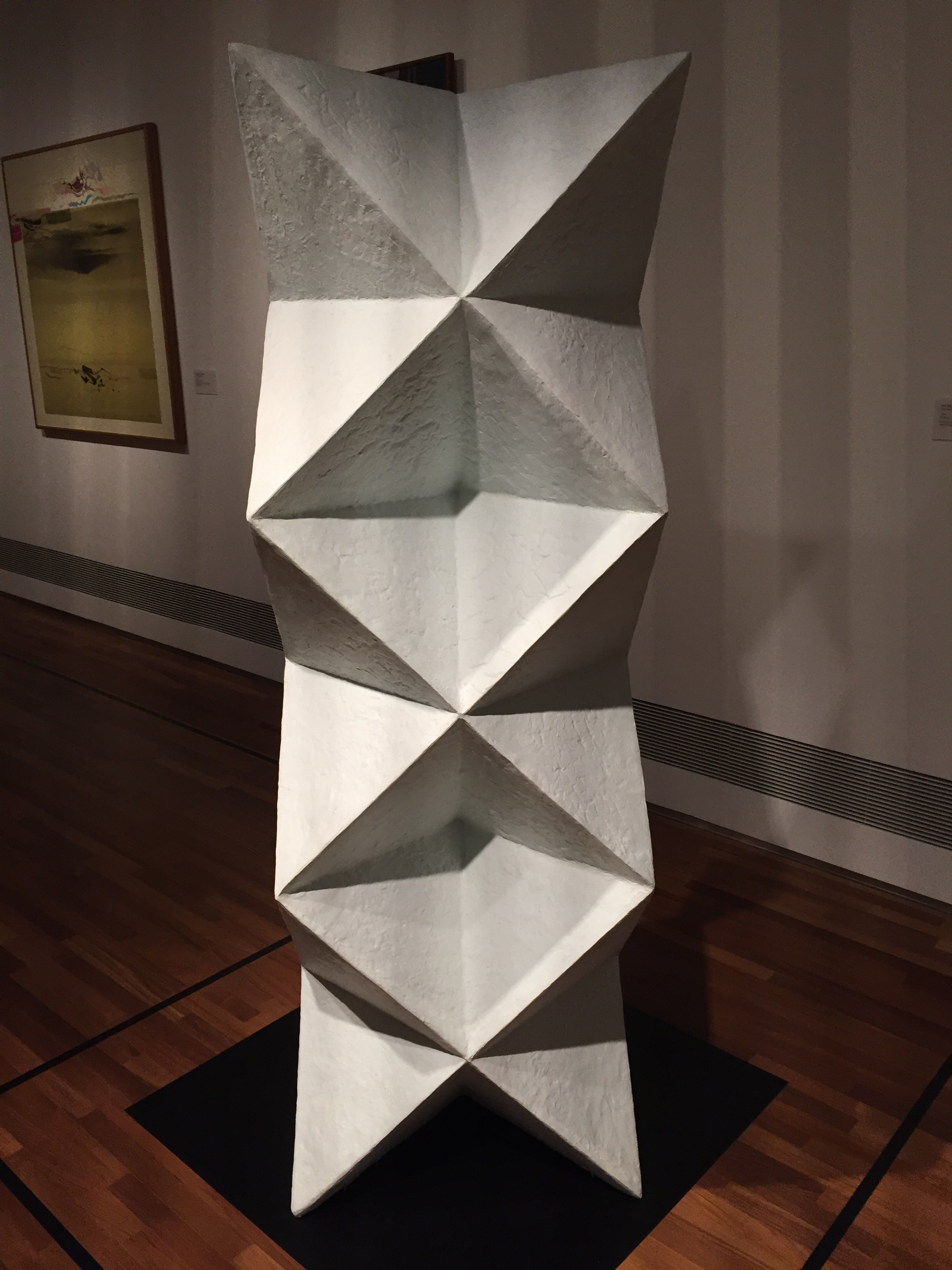
Han Sai Por, Tetrahedron-tetrahedron Interpenetration (1993), in the National Gallery Singapore

The stellated octahedron appears with several other polyhedra and polyhedral compounds in M. C. Escher's prints Stars and Study for Stars, in a skeletal style similar to that of da Vinci. It provides the central form in Escher's Double Planetoid (1949). Escher likely learned of this shape and of other compound and stellated polyhedra from Max Brückner's book Vielecke und Vielflache (1900). In Stars, it has been theorized to represent crystal twinning or a double star. In Double Planetoid, the two tetrahedra of the compound form two interpenetrating worlds, one entirely covered by architecture, the other a wilderness populated by saurian creatures.

The obelisk in the center of the Plaza de Europa in Zaragoza, Spain, is surrounded by twelve stellated octahedral lampposts, shaped to form a three-dimensional version of the Flag of Europe.

The single decoration on the tomb of André Breton, in the Batignolles Cemetery of Paris, is a stellated octahedron. French historian Henri Calhiol has documented stone carvings of this shape on several country houses in the Arrondissement of Mirande of southwestern France. They appear also in interior wooden staircase carvings in the Maison du Val de Villé in northeastern France.

=== Mysticism ===
Some modern mystics have associated this shape with the "merkaba": a "counterrotating field of light" (Note: Specifically, Melchizedek describes the merkaba as made of two coincidental stellated octahedra, or "star tetrahedra" that counter-rotate with respect to each other (i.e., four tetrahedra total, in the form of two self-dual stellated octahedra).) that "transport[s] body and soul to other dimensions." New Age authors have attributed the merkaba to ancient Egyptian origins — traditionally, "mer" stood for pyramid, "ka" for soul, and "ba" for personality or spiritual essence that guides the soul. In a different tradition, Jewish "Merkabah" mysticism details a living chariot in the visions of Ezekiel (in Hebrew, chariot is written מֶרְכָּבָה and pronounced merkābâ, where "rakab" means "to ride" or "to be carried"), used by higher angels for motility.

The triangles in the stellated octahedron have been used as a sign of the Christian Trinity, copied 24 times for the 24 hours of the day. The resemblance between this shape and the two-dimensional star of David has also been frequently noted.

== Related concepts ==
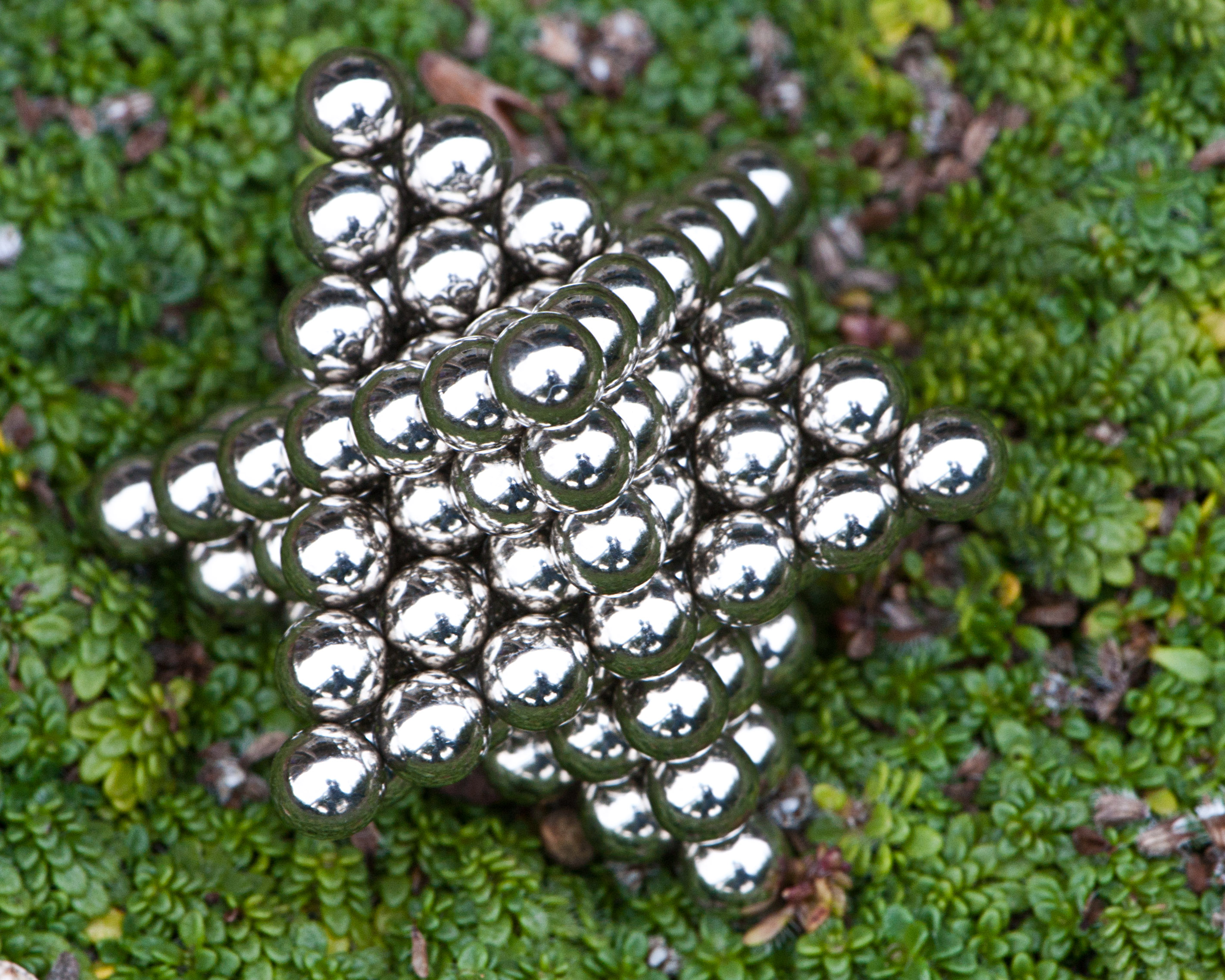
124 magnetic balls arranged into the shape of a stellated octahedron

=== Stella octangula numbers ===
The stella octangula numbers are figurate numbers that count the number of balls that can be arranged into the shape of a stellated octahedron. These numbers are the form of $n(2n^2 - 1)$ for $n$ being the positive integers; the first ten such numbers are:

0, 1, 14, 51, 124, 245, 426, 679, 1016, 1449, 1990, .... (sequence A007588 in the OEIS).

The only two of these numbers that are also square numbers are 1 and
$$9\,653\,449 = 3107^2 = 169(2\cdot 169^2-1).$$

=== Tangent circles ===
Eight circles that, when lifted to a sphere by stereographic projection, lie on the face planes of a stellated octahedron

It is a theorem of absolute geometry that, when four circles are mutually tangent, then there exists another set of four mutually tangent circles each crossing at right angles through three of the six points of tangency of the first four circles. When these circles all lie on a sphere, the planes through them form a compound of two tetrahedra, with the same combinatorial structure (but not necessarily the same shape) as a compound of two regular tetrahedra. In this case, the sphere that contains the circles is the midsphere of both tetrahedra.

=== Fractal ===
The third stage of construction of a three-dimensional fractal analogous to the Koch snowflake. The green triangles outline a central tetrahedron, the first stage, and the red triangles outline a second tetrahedron that in the second stage forms a stellated octahedron. The yellow and blue triangles are added in the third stage.

The Koch snowflake, a two-dimensional fractal resembling a hexagram, can be generalized in three dimensions to a fractal whose first stage of construction is a regular tetrahedron. Each successive stage subdivides each triangle of the previous stage into four smaller equilateral triangles and then attaches a triangular pyramid to the middle triangle of each subdivided triangle. The second stage is a stellated octahedron. In the limit, the outer surface of this three-dimensional fractal forms a cube, but unlike a cube it has a geode-like interior fractal structure.

=== Desmic tetrahedra ===
The two tetrahedra of the compound view of the stellated octahedron are "desmic", meaning that (when extended into a line in projective space) each edge of one tetrahedron crosses two opposite edges of the other tetrahedron. One of these two crossings is visible in the stellated octahedron; the other crossing occurs at a point at infinity of the projective space, where each edge of one tetrahedron crosses the parallel edge of the other tetrahedron. These two tetrahedra can be completed to a desmic system of three tetrahedra, where the third tetrahedron has as its four vertices the four centers of perspectivity of the first two tetrahedra: three points at infinity (the three points where parallel lines extending the edges of its enclosing cube meet) and the centroid of the two finite tetrahedra. Every desmic system is equivalent under projective transformations to a system formed from a stellated octahedron in this way. The same twelve tetrahedron vertices also form the points of Reye's configuration.

=== In other dimensions ===
This shape can be seen as a 3D extension of the hexagram: the hexagram is a two-dimensional shape formed from two crossing equilateral triangles, centrally symmetric to each other, and in the same way, the stellated octahedron can be formed from two centrally symmetric crossing tetrahedra. This can be generalized to any desired number of higher dimensions; the four-dimensional equivalent construction is the compound of two 5-cells.
