= Great dodecahedron =

Kepler–Poinsot polyhedron

- Type: Kepler–Poinsot polyhedron
- Faces: 12
- Edges: 30
- Vertices: 12
- Symmetry group: icosahedral symmetry I_{h}
- Dual polyhedron: small stellated dodecahedron
- Properties: regular, non-convex

Vertex figure

3D model of a great dodecahedron

In geometry, the great dodecahedron is one of four Kepler–Poinsot polyhedra. It is composed of 12 pentagonal faces (six pairs of parallel pentagons), intersecting each other making a pentagrammic path, with five pentagons meeting at each vertex.

== Construction ==
One way to construct a great dodecahedron is by faceting the regular icosahedron. In other words, it is constructed from the regular icosahedron by removing its polygonal faces without changing or creating new vertices. For each vertex of the icosahedron, the five neighboring vertices become those of a regular pentagon face of the great dodecahedron. The resulting shape has a pentagram as its vertex figure, so its Schläfli symbol is {5, 5/2}.

The great dodecahedron may also be interpreted as the second stellation of dodecahedron. The construction started from a regular dodecahedron by attaching 12 pentagonal pyramids onto each of its faces, known as the first stellation. The second stellation appears when 30 wedges are attached to it.

== Formulas ==
Given a great dodecahedron with edge length E,

Inradius:	$\quad E \times \frac{\sqrt{50+10\sqrt{5}}}{20}$
Midradius:	$\quad E \times \frac{1+\sqrt{5}}{4}$
Circumradius:	$\quad E \times \frac{\sqrt{10+2\sqrt{5}}}{4}$
Surface area:	$\quad E^2 \times 15\sqrt{5-2\sqrt{5}}$
Volume:	$\quad E^3 \times \frac{5\sqrt{5}-5}{4}$

== Appearance ==
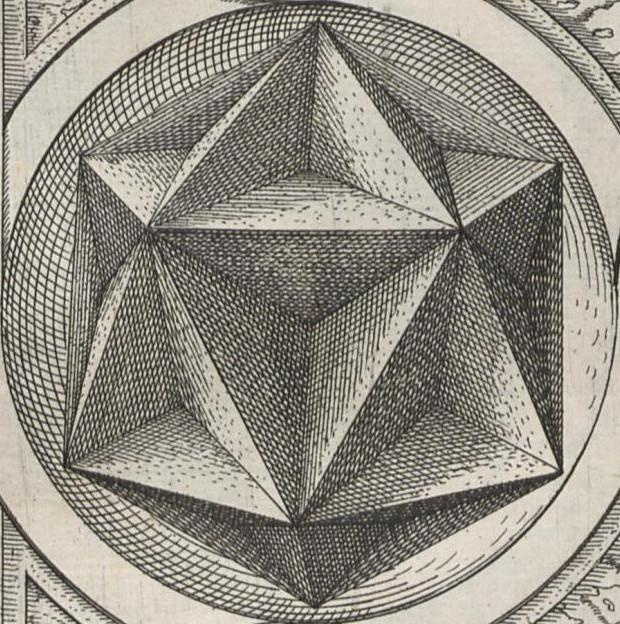
Great dodecahedron in Perspectiva Corporum Regularium

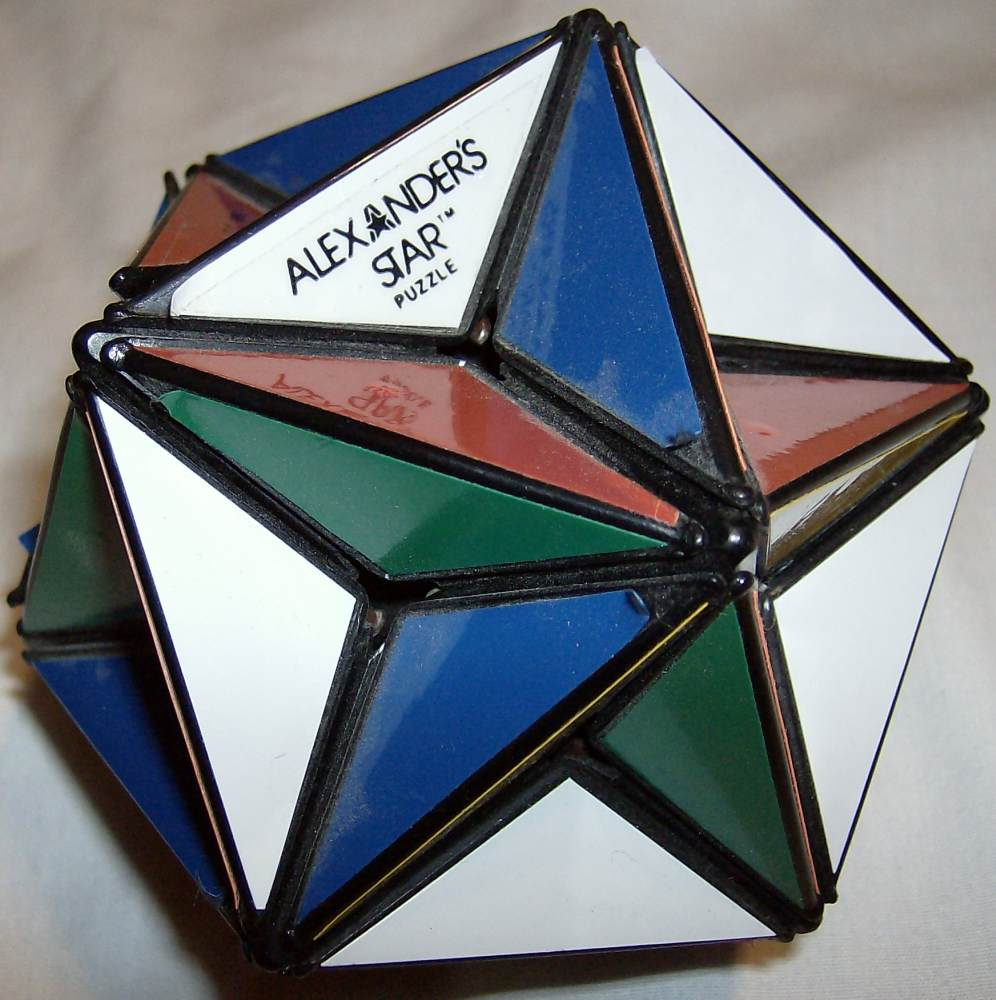
Alexander's Star in solved state

Historically, the great dodecahedron is one of two solids discovered by Louis Poinsot in 1810, with some people naming it a Poinsot solid after him. As for the background, Poinsot rediscovered two other solids that were already discovered by Johannes Kepler—the small stellated dodecahedron and the great stellated dodecahedron. However, the great dodecahedron appeared in the 1568 Perspectiva Corporum Regularium by Wenzel Jamnitzer.

A great dodecahedron rotating

The great dodecahedron has appeared in popular culture and toys. An example is Alexander's Star puzzle, a twisty puzzle that is based on a great dodecahedron.

== Related polyhedra ==
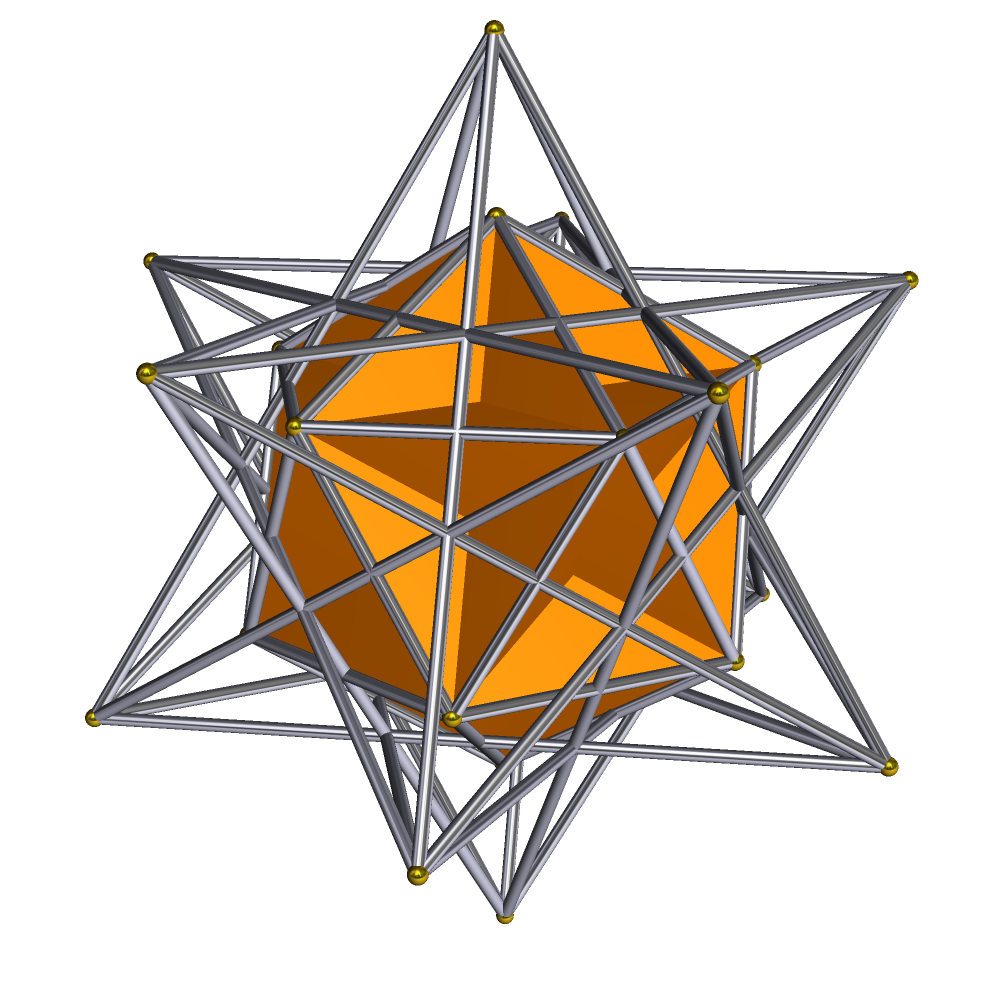
Great dodecahedron shown solid, surrounding stellated dodecahedron only as wireframe

Animated truncation sequence from {5/2, 5} to {5, 5/2}

The compound of small stellated dodecahedron and great dodecahedron is a polyhedron compound where the great dodecahedron is internal to its dual, the small stellated dodecahedron. This can be seen as one of the two three-dimensional equivalents of the compound of two pentagrams ({10/4} "decagram"); this series continues into the fourth dimension as compounds of star 4-polytopes.

A truncation process applied to the great dodecahedron produces a series of nonconvex uniform polyhedra. Truncating edges down to points produces the dodecadodecahedron as a rectified great dodecahedron. The process completes as a birectification, reducing the original faces down to points, and producing the small stellated dodecahedron.

It shares the same edge arrangement as the convex regular icosahedron; the compound with both is the small complex icosidodecahedron.
