= Wilhelm Ljunggren =

Norwegian mathematician (1905–1973)

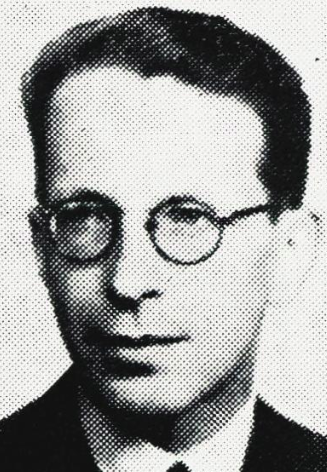
Wilhelm Ljunggren

Wilhelm Ljunggren (7 October 1905 – 25 January 1973) was a Norwegian mathematician, specializing in number theory.

== Career ==
Ljunggren was born in Kristiania and finished his secondary education in 1925. He studied at the University of Oslo, earning a master's degree in 1931 under the supervision of Thoralf Skolem, and found employment as a secondary school mathematics teacher in Bergen, following Skolem who had moved in 1930 to the Chr. Michelsen Institute there. While in Bergen, Ljunggren continued his studies, earning a dr.philos. from the University of Oslo in 1937.

In 1938 he moved to work as a teacher at Hegdehaugen in Oslo. In 1943 he became a fellow of the Norwegian Academy of Science and Letters, and he also joined the Selskapet til Vitenskapenes Fremme. He was appointed as a docent at the University of Oslo in 1948, but in 1949 he returned to Bergen as a professor at the recently founded University of Bergen. He moved back to the University of Oslo again in 1956, where he served until his death in 1973 in Oslo.

=== Research ===
Ljunggren's research concerned number theory, and in particular Diophantine equations. He showed that Ljunggren's equation,

X^{2} = 2Y^{4} − 1.

has only the two integer solutions (1,1) and (239,13); however, his proof was complicated, and after Louis J. Mordell conjectured that it could be simplified, simpler proofs were published by several other authors.

Ljunggren also posed the question of finding the integer solutions to the Ramanujan–Nagell equation

2^{n} − 7 = x^{2}

(or equivalently, of finding triangular Mersenne numbers) in 1943, independently of Srinivasa Ramanujan who had asked the same question in 1913.

Ljunggren's publications are collected in a book edited by Paulo Ribenboim.
