= Stella octangula number =

Figurate number based on the stella octangula

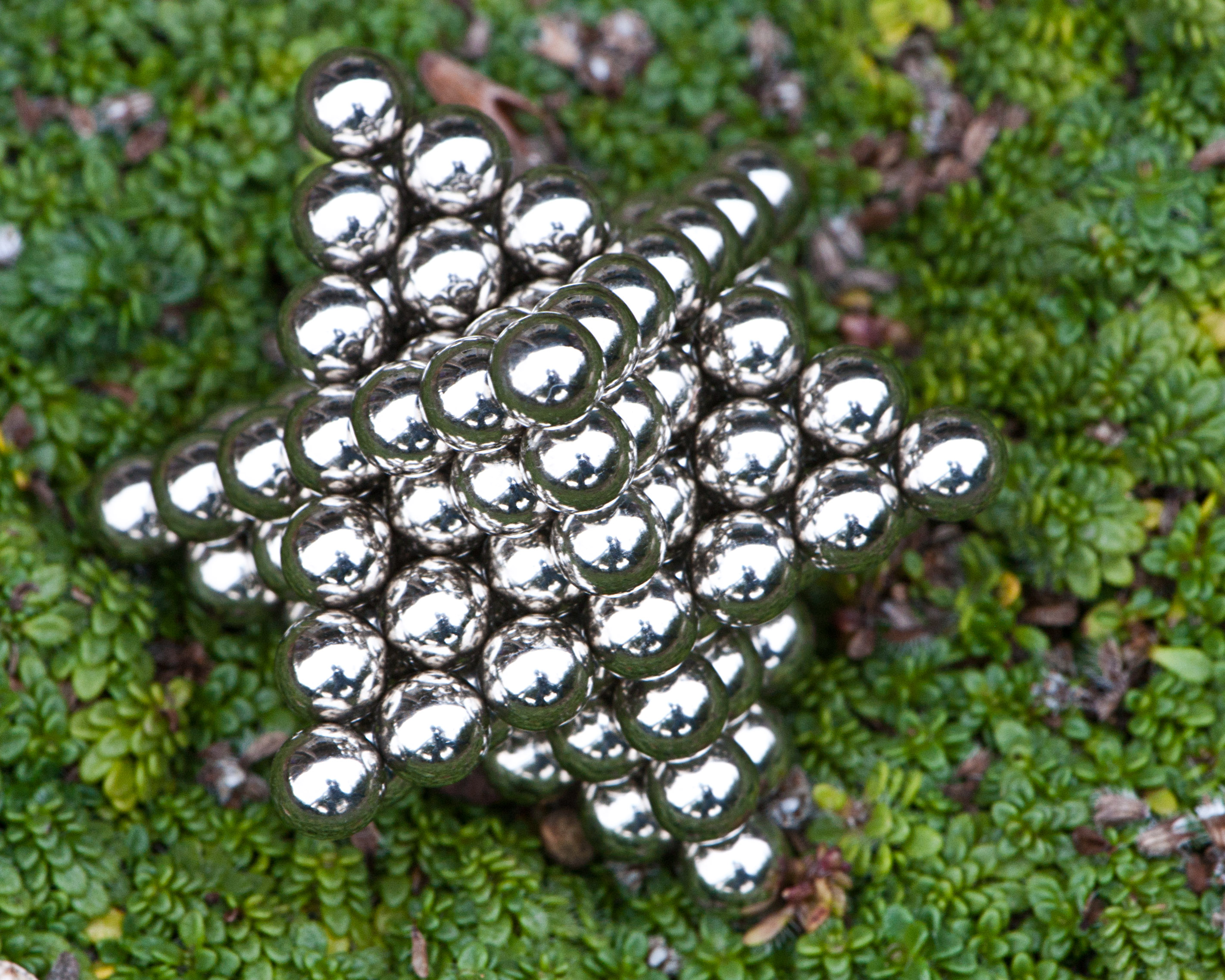
124 magnetic balls arranged into the shape of a stella octangula

In mathematics, a stella octangula number is a figurate number based on the stella octangula, of the form n(2n^{2} − 1).

The sequence of stella octangula numbers is

0, 1, 14, 51, 124, 245, 426, 679, 1016, 1449, 1990, ... (sequence A007588 in the OEIS)

Only two of these numbers are square.

== Ljunggren's equation ==
There are only two positive square stella octangula numbers, 1 and 9653449 = 3107^{2} = (13 × 239)^{2}, corresponding to n = 1 and n = 169 respectively. The elliptic curve describing the square stella octangula numbers,

$$m^2 = n (2n^2 - 1),$$

may be placed in the equivalent Weierstrass form

$$x^2 = y^3 - 2y$$

by the change of variables x = 2m, y = 2n. Because the two factors n and 2n^{2} − 1 of the square number m^{2} are relatively prime, they must each be squares themselves, and the second change of variables $X=m/\sqrt{n}$ and $Y=\sqrt{n}$ leads to Ljunggren's equation

$X^2 = 2Y^4 - 1$

A theorem of Siegel states that every elliptic curve has only finitely many integer solutions, and Wilhelm Ljunggren (1942) found a difficult proof that the only integer solutions to his equation were (1,1) and (239,13), corresponding to the two square stella octangula numbers. Louis J. Mordell conjectured that the proof could be simplified, and several later authors published simplifications.

== Additional applications ==
The stella octangula numbers arise in a parametric family of instances to the crossed ladders problem in which the lengths and heights of the ladders and the height of their crossing point are all integers. In these instances, the ratio between the heights of the two ladders is a stella octangula number.
