= Jost Amman =

Swiss-German artist (1539–1591)

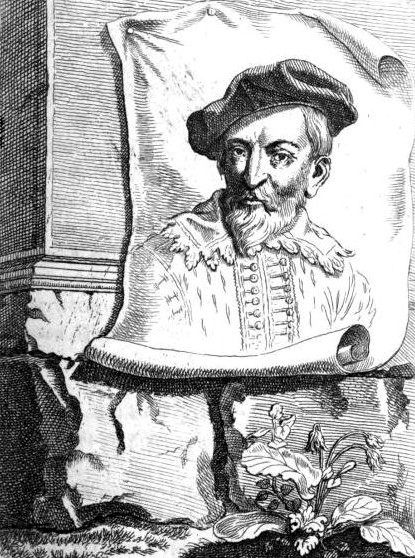
- Portrait of Jost Amman
- Born: 3 June 1539; Zürich, Old Swiss Confederacy
- Died: 17 March 1591 (aged 51); Nuremberg, HRE
- Known for: Woodcuts
- Notable work: Das Ständebuch
- Movement: Northern Renaissance

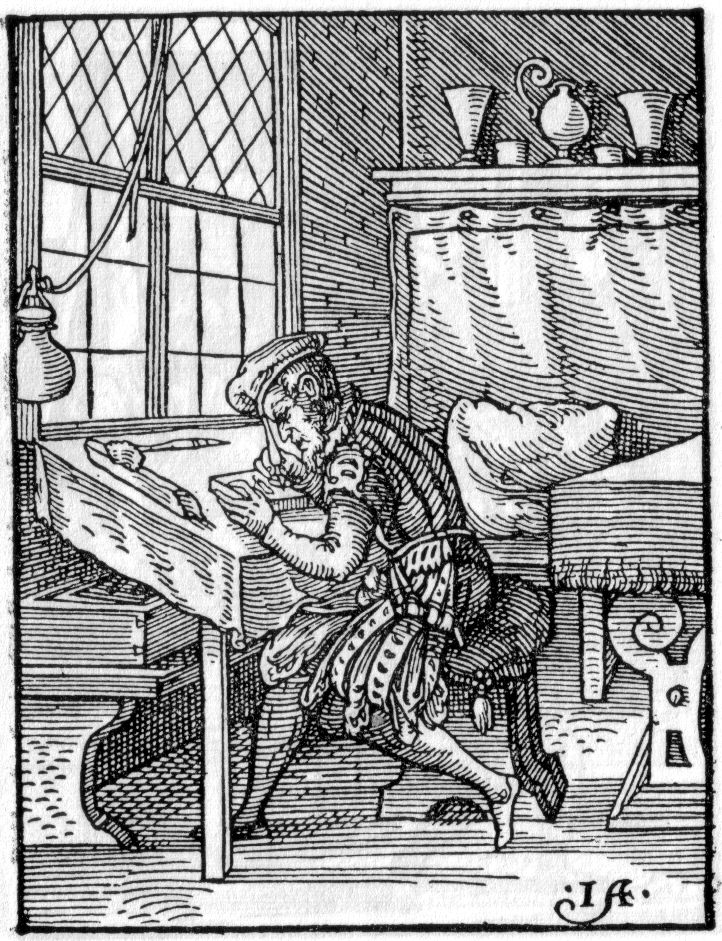
Formschneider, that is, block-cutter for woodcuts, 1568. From Das Ständebuch, a famous series of woodcuts of the trades by Amman (who would not usually have done his own cutting)

Jost Amman (June 13, 1539 – March 17, 1591) was a Swiss-German artist, celebrated chiefly for his woodcuts, done mainly for book illustrations.

== Early life ==
Amman was born in Zürich, the son of a professor of Classics and Logic. He was himself well-educated. Little of his personal history is known beyond the fact that he moved to Nuremberg in 1560, where he took on citizenship and continued to reside until his death in March 1591. He worked initially with Virgil Solis, then a leading producer of book illustrations.

== Career ==
His productivity was very remarkable, as may be gathered from the statement of one of his pupils, who said that the drawings he made during a period of four years would have filled a hay wagon. A large number of his original drawings are in the Berlin print room. About 1,500 prints are attributed to him. He was one of the last major producers of woodcuts for books, as during his career engravings were gradually taking over that role. Although like most woodcut artists, he normally let a specialist formschneider cut the block to his drawing, he occasionally included both a cutter's knife and a quill pen in his signature on prints, suggesting he sometimes cut his own blocks.

Amman was the artist for Wenzel Jamnitzer's book Perspectiva corporum regularium (1568). A series of engravings by Amman of the kings of France, with short biographies, appeared in Frankfurt in 1576. He also executed many of the woodcut illustrations for the Bible published at Frankfurt by Sigismund Feierabend, and for a topographical survey of Bavaria by Philipp Apian. Another serial work, the Panoplia Omnium Liberalium Mechanicarum et Seden-tariarum Artium Genera Continens, containing 115 plates, is of great value. Amman's drawing is correct and spirited, and his delineation of the details of costume is minute and accurate. Paintings in oil and on glass are attributed to him, but none have been identified.

== Death ==
Amman died in Nuremberg, Bavaria, aged 51.
