= Gerard Douffet =

Walloon painter

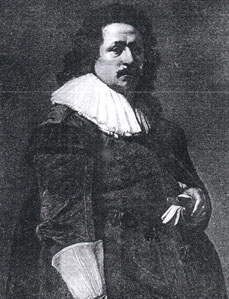
Portrait of Douffet, from the Alte Pinakothek in Munich

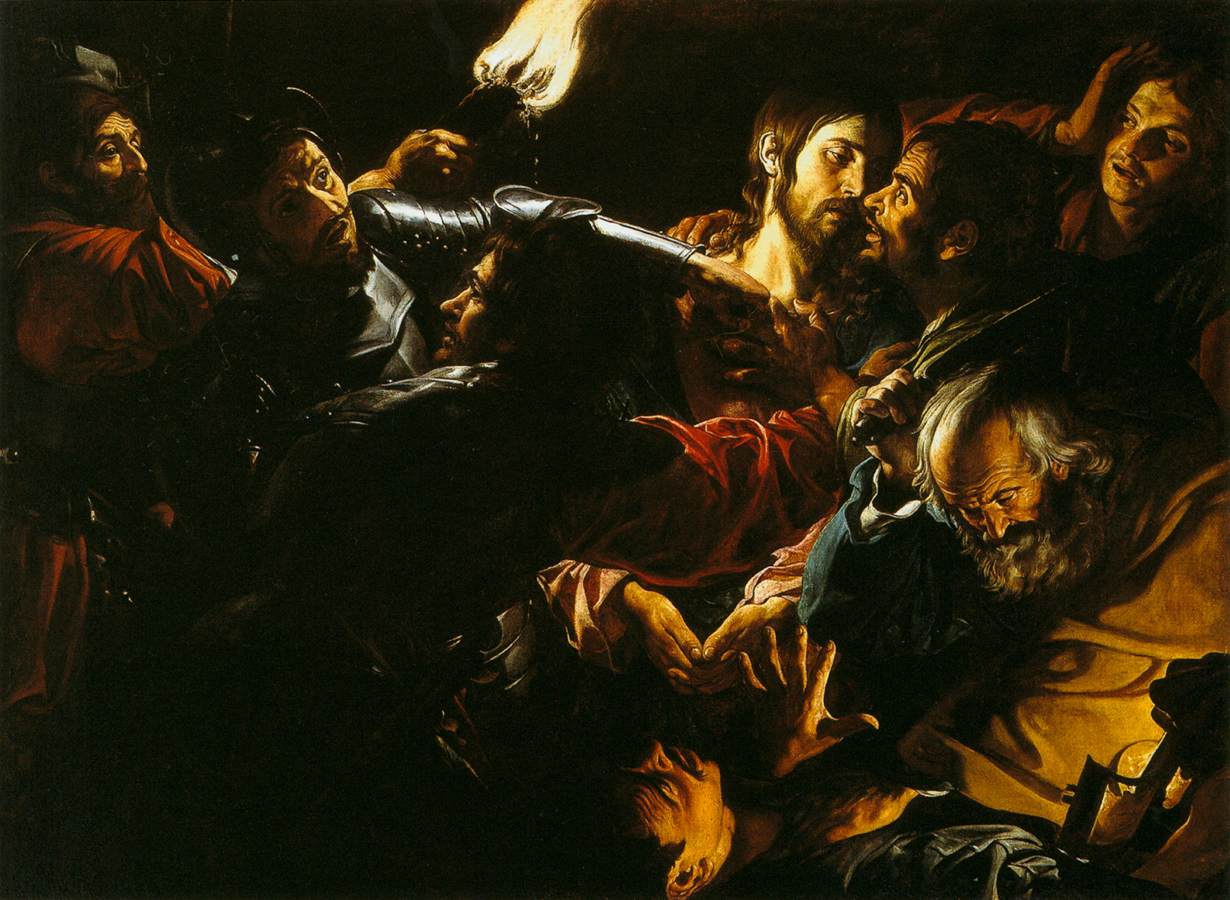
The Taking of Christ by Douffet, c. 1620, now in the Museum of Fine Arts, Boston

Gerard Douffet (6 August 1594 – 1660/1661), also known as Doufeet or Duffeit, was a Walloon painter. He was born at Liège in 1594, and studied for some time at Antwerp, Belgium in the school of Rubens, and afterwards in Italy. He composed and designed with good taste, and his historical pictures are much esteemed. "Pope Nicholas V at the Tomb of St. Francis of Assisi" (painted in 1627), "St. Helena and the True Cross" (painted for the Abbaye Saint-Laurent de Liège), and two male portraits (one dated 1624), are in the Munich Gallery. He died at Liège, Belgium in 1660.

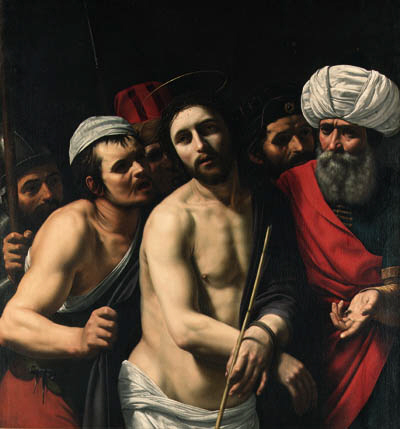
Ecce Homo, until the 1950s attributed to Caravaggio: in 1998 sold for £91,700 at Christie's
