= Three Worlds (Escher) =

Lithograph by Dutch artist M. C. Escher

- Artist: M. C. Escher
- Year: 1955
- Type: lithograph
- Dimensions: 36.2 cm × 24.7 cm (14.3 in × 9.7 in)

Three Worlds is a lithograph print by the Dutch artist M. C. Escher first printed in December 1955.

Three Worlds depicts a large pool or lake during the autumn or winter. The title refers to the three perspectives visible in the picture: the surface of the water on which leaves float, the world above the surface, observable by the water's reflection of a forest, and the world below the surface, observable in a large fish swimming just below the water's surface.

Escher also created a picture named Two Worlds.

== See also ==
- Puddle
- Printmaking

== Sources ==
- Locher, J. L. (2000). The Magic of M. C. Escher. Harry N. Abrams, Inc. ISBN 0-8109-6720-0.
