= Gravitation (M. C. Escher) =

Mixed media work by M.C. Escher

- Artist: M. C. Escher
- Year: 1952
- Type: lithograph and watercolour
- Dimensions: 29.7 cm × 29.7 cm (11.7 in × 11.7 in)

Gravitation (also known as Gravity) is a mixed media work by the Dutch artist M. C. Escher completed in June 1952. It was first printed as a black-and-white lithograph and then coloured by hand in watercolour.

It depicts a nonconvex regular polyhedron known as the small stellated dodecahedron. Each facet of the figure has a trapezial doorway. Out of these doorways protrude the heads and legs of twelve turtles without shells, who are using the object as a common shell. The turtles are in six coloured pairs (red, orange, yellow, magenta, green and indigo) with each turtle directly opposite its counterpart.

== See also ==
- Printmaking
