= Perspectiva corporum regularium =

1568 book on polyhedra by Wenzel Jamnitzer

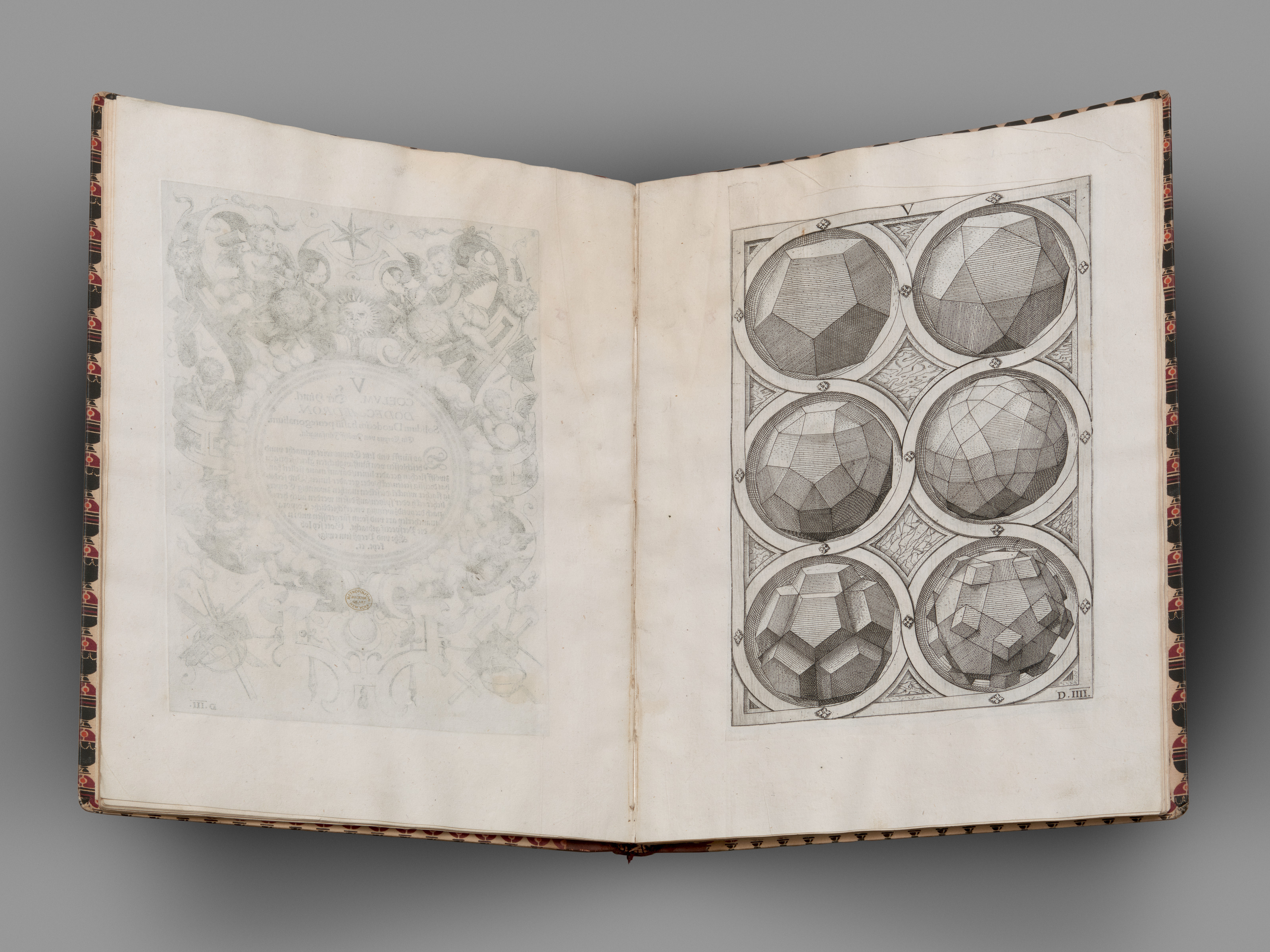
A copy of Perspectiva corporum regularium in the Metropolitan Museum of Art, open to one of the pages depicting variations of the dodecahedron

Perspectiva corporum regularium (from Latin: Perspective of the Regular Solids) is a book of perspective drawings of polyhedra by German Renaissance goldsmith Wenzel Jamnitzer, with engravings by Jost Amman, published in 1568.

Despite its Latin title, Perspectiva corporum regularium is written mainly in the German language. It was "the most lavish of the perspective books published in Germany in the late sixteenth century" and was included in several royal art collections. It may have been the first work to depict chiral icosahedral symmetry.

== Topics ==
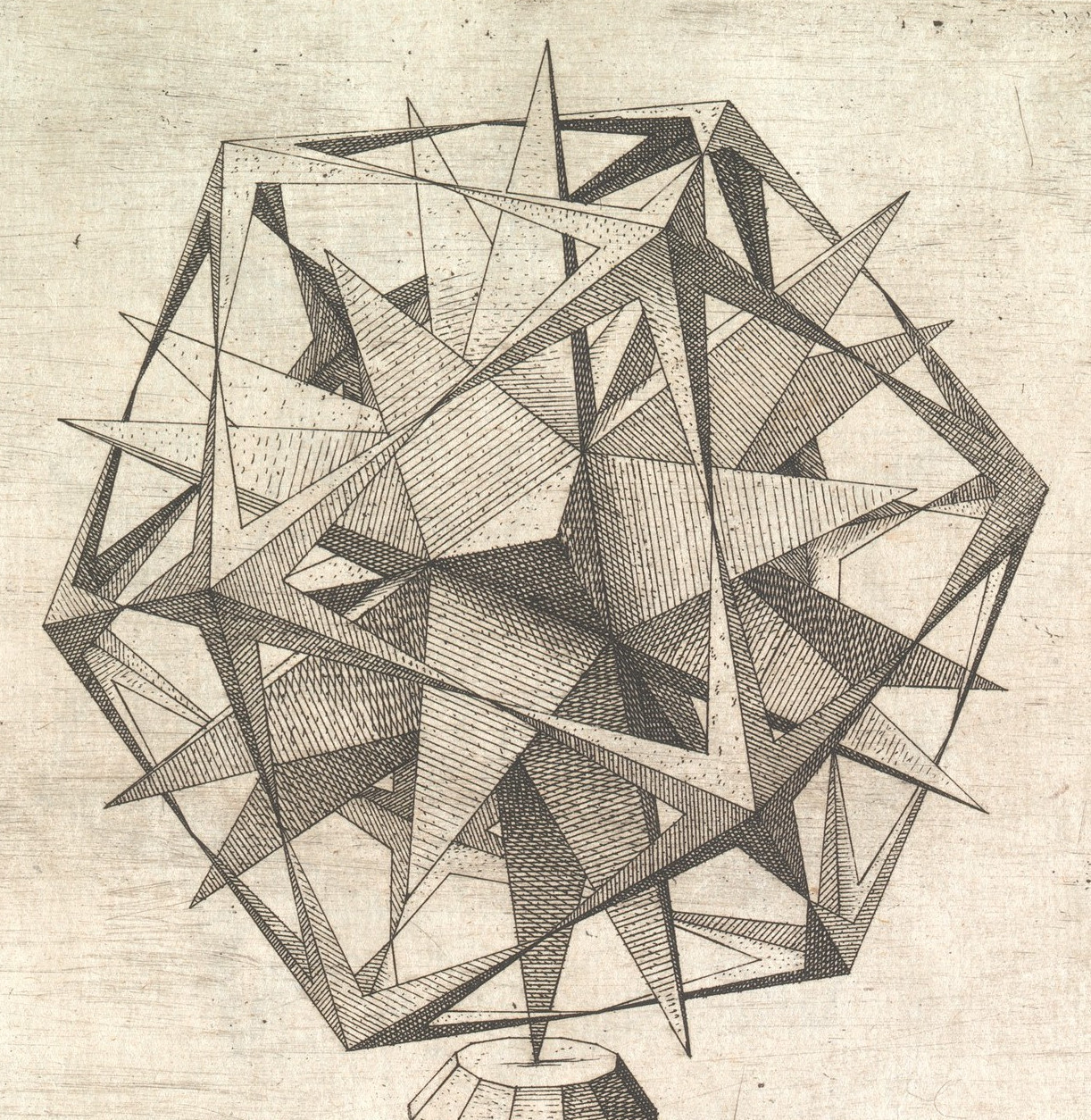
Great stellated dodecahedron enclosed by a skeletal icosahedron from Perspectiva corporum regularium

The book focuses on the five Platonic solids, with the subtitles of its title page citing Plato's Timaeus and Euclid's Elements for their history. Each of these five shapes has a chapter, whose title page relates the connection of its polyhedron to the classical elements in medieval cosmology: fire for the tetrahedron, earth for the cube, air for the octahedron, and water for the icosahedron, with the dodecahedron representing the heavens, its 12 faces corresponding to the 12 symbols of the zodiac. Each chapter includes four engravings of polyhedra, each showing six variations of the shape including some of their stellations and truncations, for a total of 120 polyhedra. This great amount of variation, some of which obscures the original Platonic form of each polyhedron, demonstrates the theory of the time that all the variation seen in the physical world comes from the combination of these basic elements.

Following these chapters, additional engravings depict additional polyhedral forms, including polyhedral compounds such as the stella octangula, polyhedral variations of spheres and cones, and outlined skeletons of polyhedra following those drawn by Leonardo da Vinci for Luca Pacioli's earlier book Divina proportione. In this part of the book, the shapes are arranged in a three-dimensional setting and often placed on smaller polyhedral pedestals.

== Creation process ==
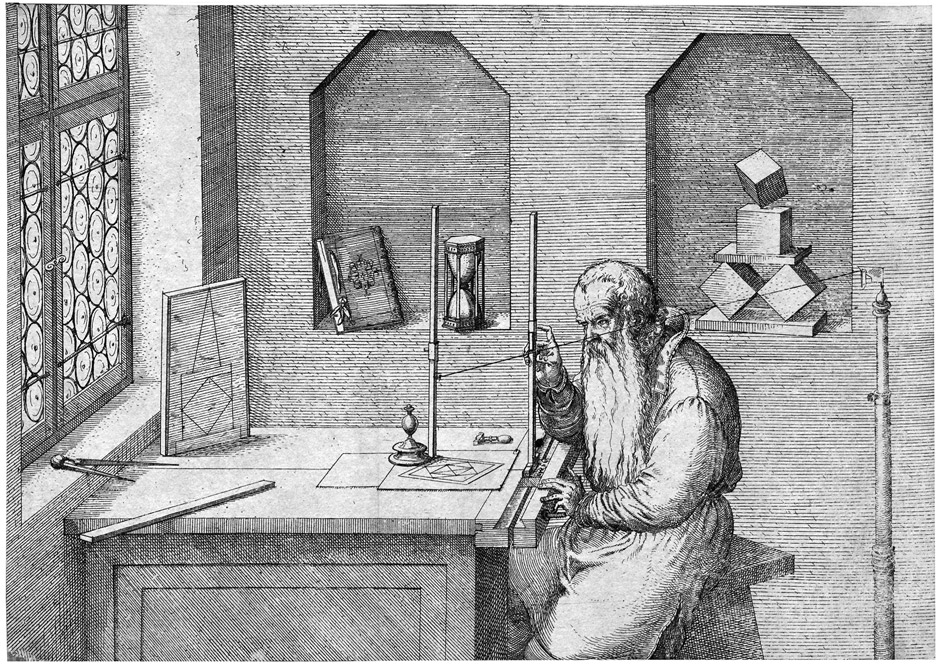
Wenzel Jamnitzer making a perspective drawing, as depicted by Jost Amman (c. 1565)

The roughly 50 engravings for the book were made by Jost Amman, a German woodcut artist, based on drawings by Jamnitzer. As Jamnitzer describes in his prologue, he built models of polyhedra out of paper and wood and used a mechanical device to help trace their perspective. This process was depicted in another engraving by Amman from around 1565, showing Jamnitzer at work on his drawings. Amman included this engraving in another book, Das Ständebuch (1658).

== Related works ==
A later work on perspective, Artes Excelençias de la Perspectiba (1688) by P. Gómez de Alcuña, was heavily influenced by Jamnitzer.

A 2008 German postage stamp, issued to commemorate the 500th anniversary of Jamnitzer's birth, included a reproduction of one of the pages of the book, depicting two polyhedral cones tilted towards each other. The full sheet of ten stamps also includes another figure from the book, a skeletal icosahedron.

A French edition of Perspectiva corporum regularium, edited by Albert Flocon, was published by Brieux in 1964. Gutenberg Reprints republished it both in the original German and in the French edition in 1981. A Spanish translation of Perspectiva corporum regularium was published in 2006.

== See also ==
- List of books about polyhedra
