= Wenzel Jamnitzer =

German goldsmith and artist (1507/08–1585)

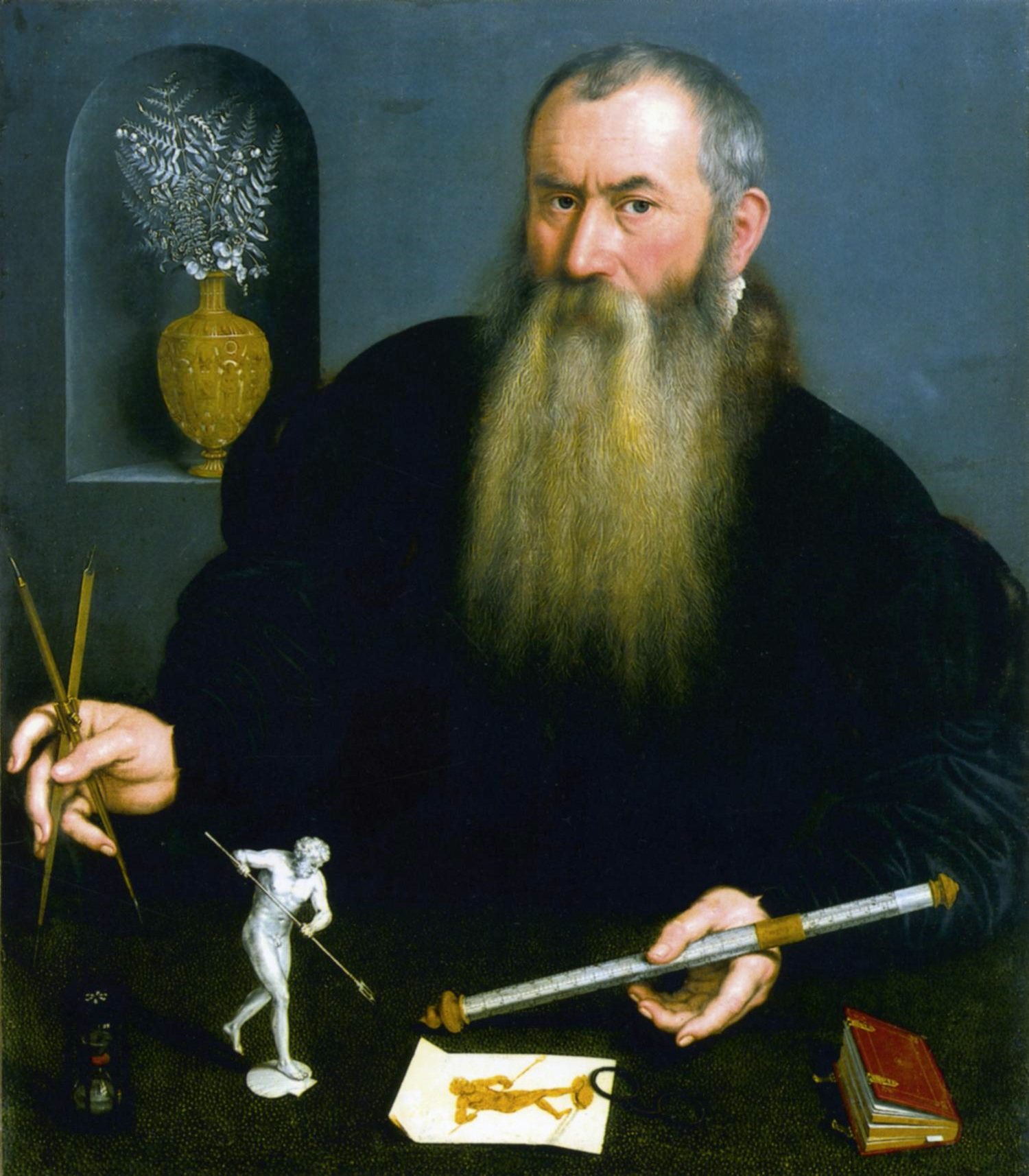
Wenzel Jamnitzer.

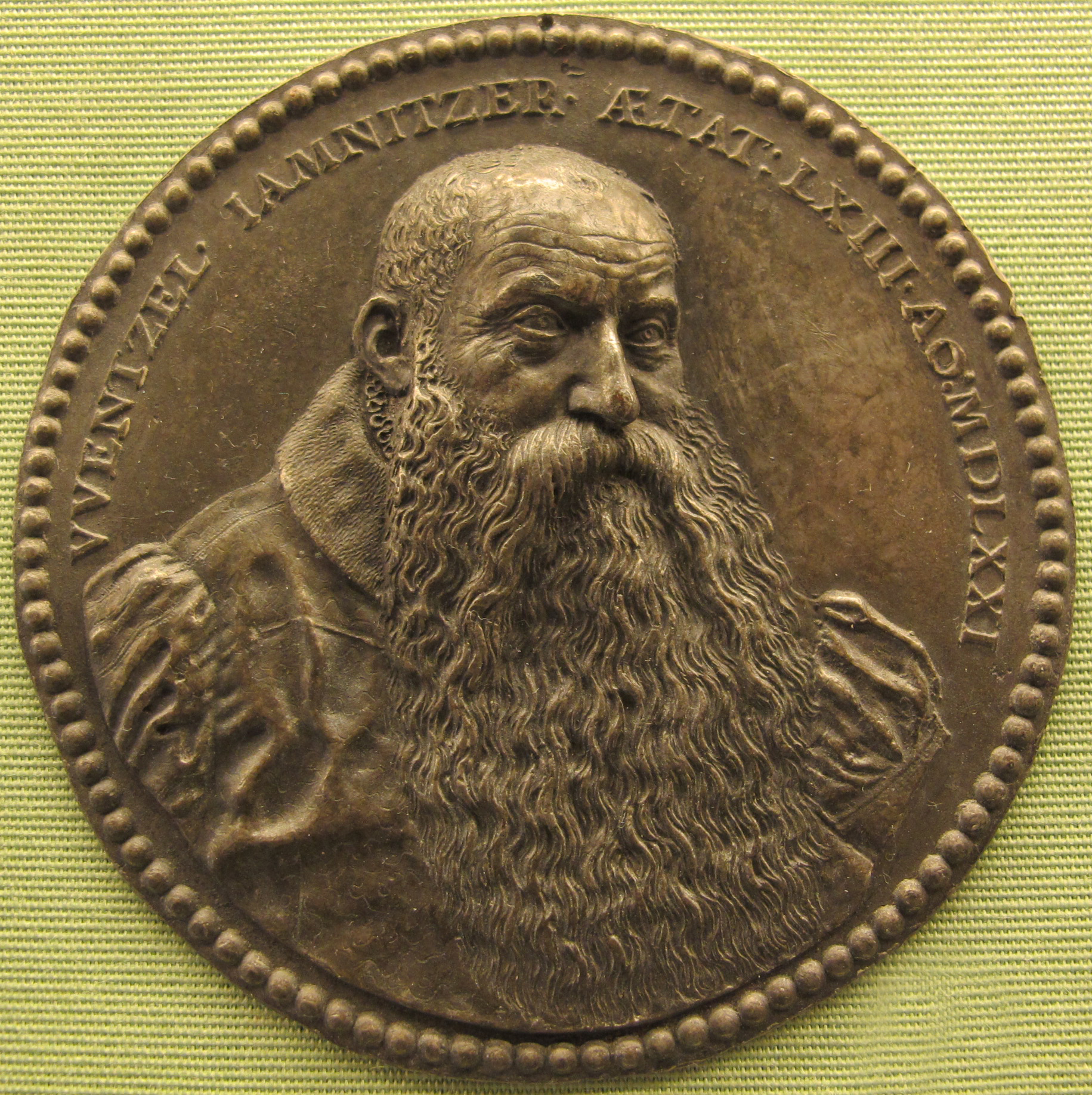
Valentin Maler, Wenzel Jamnitzer medal, 1571

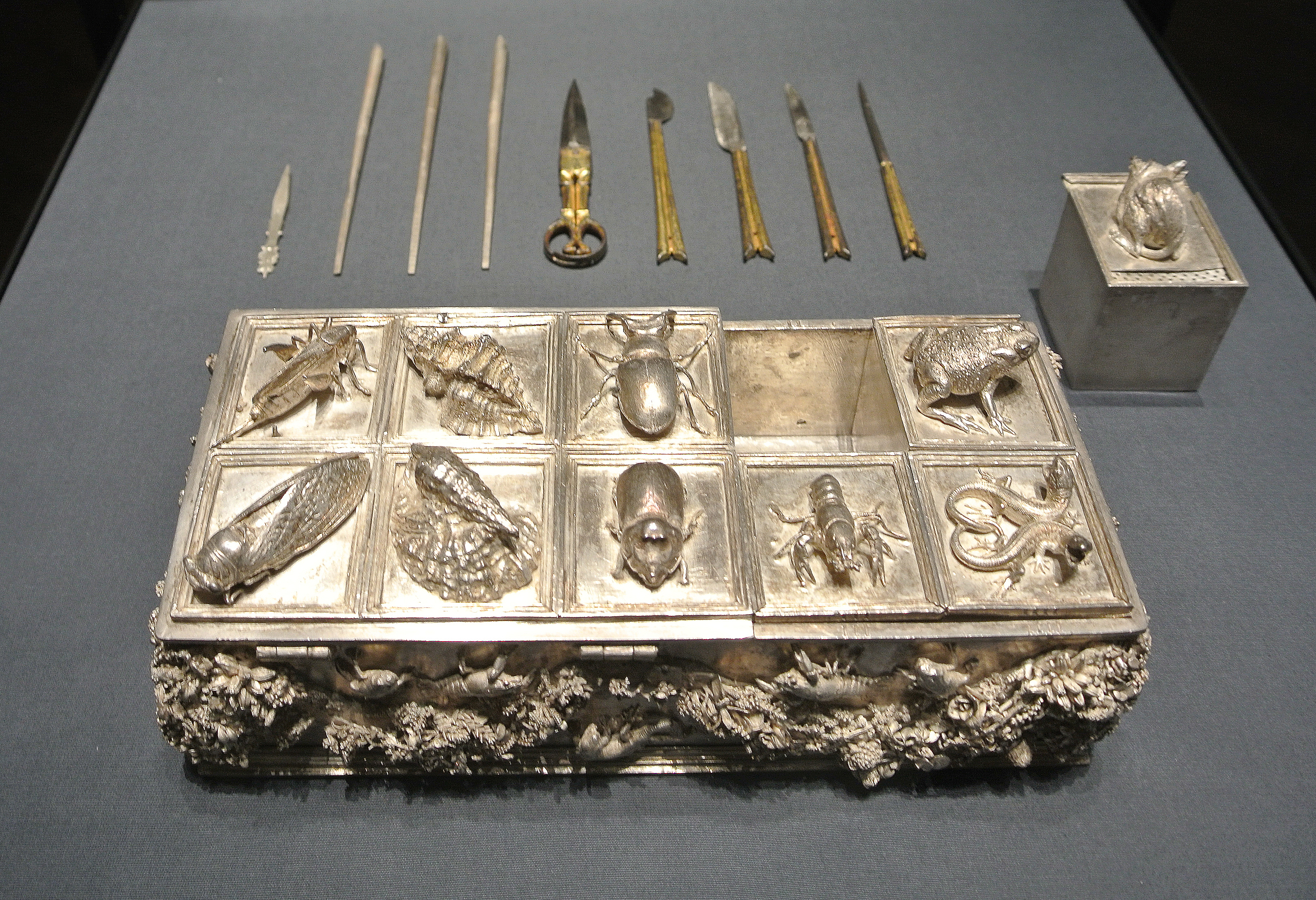
Silver box for writing implements

Plate silver, gold, 1582

Wenzel Jamnitzer (sometimes Jamitzer, or Wenzel Gemniczer) (1507/1508 – 19 December 1585) was a Northern Mannerist goldsmith, artist, and printmaker in etching, who worked in Nuremberg. He was the best known German goldsmith of his era, and court goldsmith to a succession of Holy Roman Emperors.

A native of Vienna, Jamnitzer was a member of a Moravian German family which, for more than 160 years, had produced works under the names Jamnitzer, Jemniczer, Gemniczer, and Jamitzer. Wenzel, with his brother Albrecht, was trained by his father Hans the Elder. Later, Wenzel's son Hans Jamnitzer (1539–1603) and grandson Christof Jamnitzer (1563–1618) continued his business.

Jamnitzer worked as a court goldsmith for all the German emperors of his era, including Charles V, Ferdinand I, Maximilian II, and Rudolf II. Also, he probably invented an embossing machine.

In 1534, Jamnitzer settled in Nuremberg. He made vases and jewelry boxes with great skill, in a style based on that of the Italian Renaissance. Besides precious metals, he incorporated hardstones, shells, corals, and small birds' eggs in his works.

In 1543 he was appointed as a coin and seal die-cutter by the city of Nuremberg. In 1552, he became master of the city mint.

Jamnitzer performed scientific studies to improve the technical knowledge of his guild. In 1568 he published Perspectiva Corporum Regularium (Perspective of regular solids), a book remembered for its engravings of polyhedra. This book was based on Plato's Timaeus and Euclid's Elements, and it contained 120 forms based on the Platonic solids.

From 1573, Jamnitzer represented the Goldsmiths on the Nuremberg city council. From 1571 to 1576, he worked with Johan Gregor van der Schardt, a sculptor. Wenzel Jamnitzer died on 19 December 1585 and was buried in St. John's Cemetery in Nuremberg (grave No. 664). His grave is decorated in bronze and has an epitaph by Jost Amman, an artist known for his woodcuts.

Examples of his work can be seen in Vienna, the Louvre, and the Victoria and Albert Museum in London, and elsewhere. Many of his works were probably melted down during the Thirty Years' War.
