= Compound of four cubes =

Polyhedral compound

Compound of four cubes
(Animation)
Type	Compound
Convex hull	Chamfered cube
Polyhedra	4 cubes
Faces	32 squares
Edges	48
Vertices	32 (8 + 24)
Symmetry group	octahedral (O_{h})
Subgroup restricting to one constituent	3-fold antiprismatic (D_{3d})

The compound of four cubes or Bakos compound is a face-transitive polyhedron compound of four cubes with octahedral symmetry. It is the dual of the compound of four octahedra. Its surface area is 687/77 square lengths of the edge.

Its Cartesian coordinates are (±3, ±3, ±3) and the permutations of (±5, ±1, ±1).

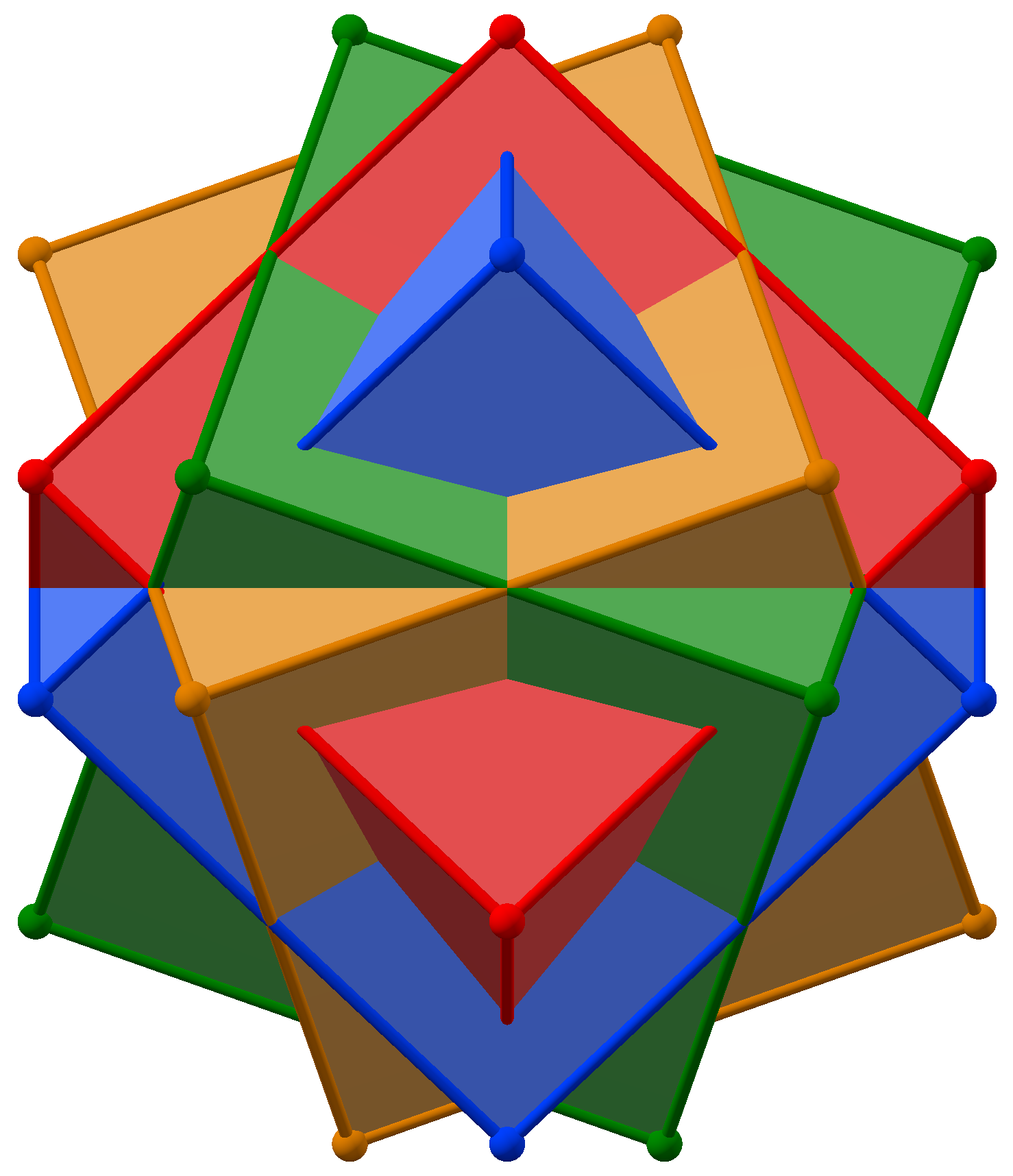
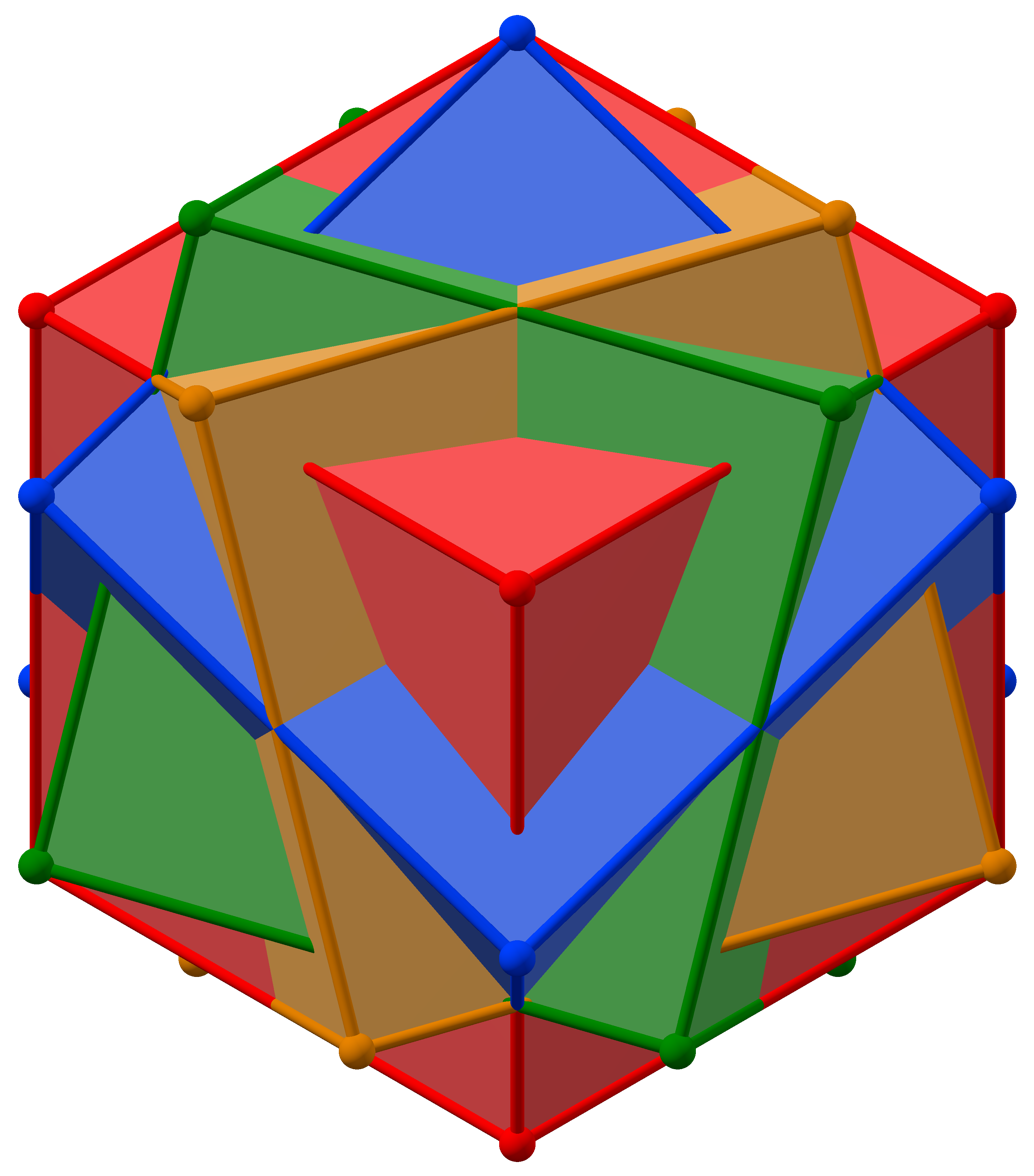
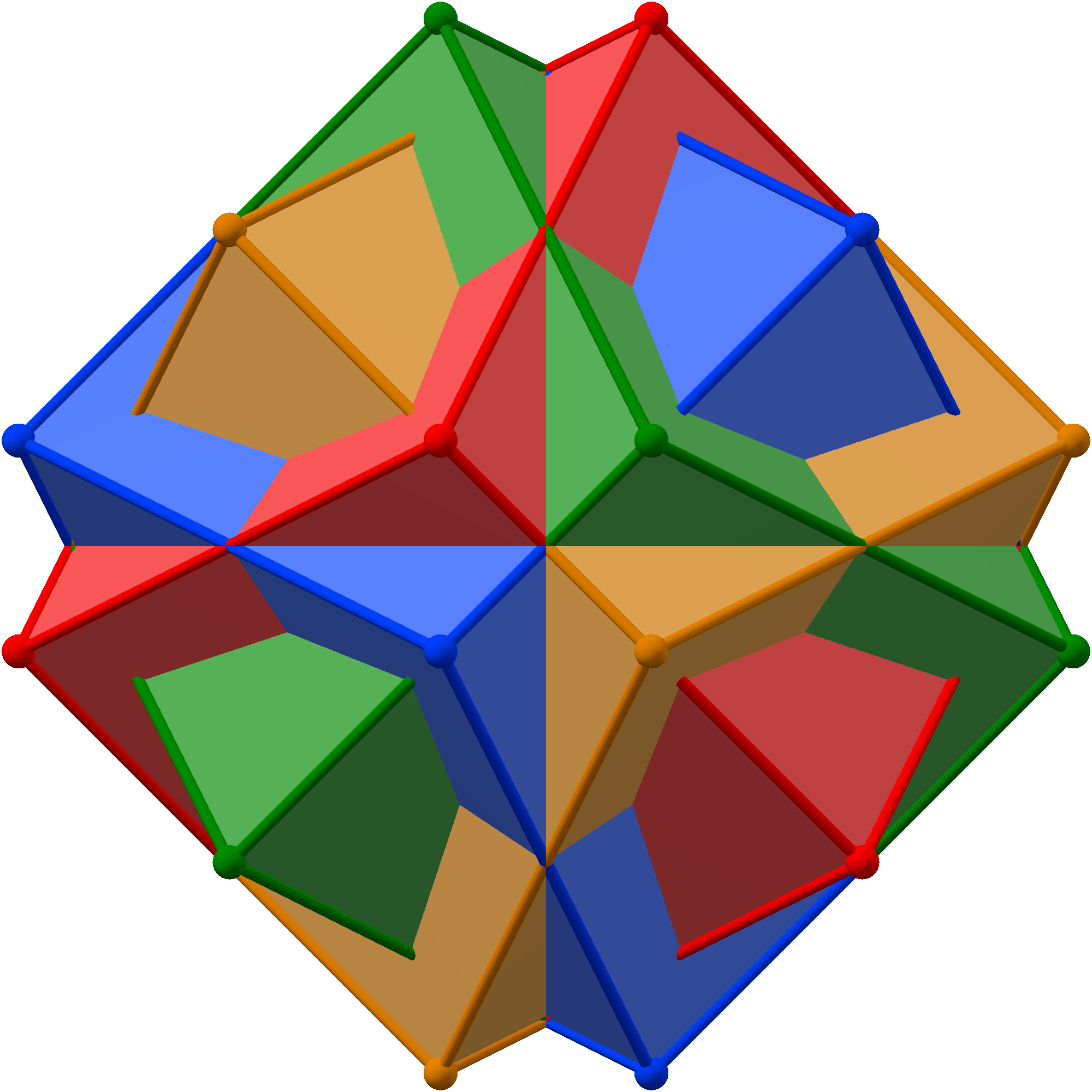
Views from 2-fold, 3-fold and 4-fold symmetry axis

== Extension with fifth cube ==
The eight vertices on the 3-fold symmetry axes can be seen as the vertices of a fifth cube of the same size. Referring to the images below, the four old cubes are called colored, and the new one black. Each colored cube has two opposite vertices on a 3-fold symmetry axis, which are shared with the black cube. (In the picture both 3-fold vertices of the green cube are visible.) The remaining six vertices of each colored cube correspond to the faces of the black cube. This compound shares these properties with the compound of five cubes (related to the dodecahedron), into which it can be transformed by rotating the colored cubes on their 3-fold axes.

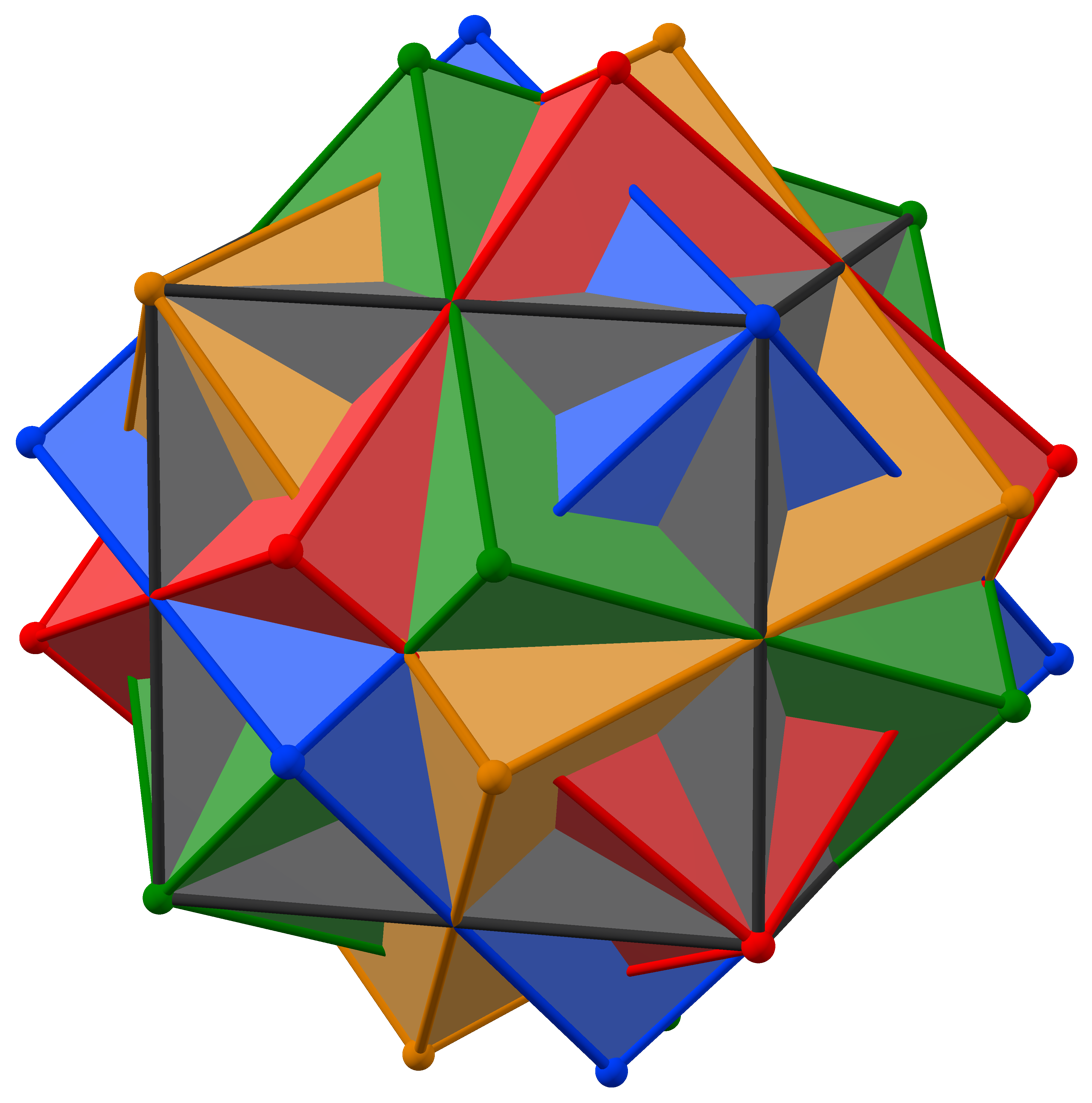
Extension (see animation) and its transition to the icosahedral compound

== See also ==
- Compound of three octahedra
- Compound of five octahedra
- Compound of ten octahedra
- Compound of twenty octahedra
- Compound of three cubes
- Compound of five cubes
- Compound of six cubes
- Uniform polyhedron compound
