= Regular octahedron =

Solid with eight equal triangular faces

- Type: antiprism, bipyramid, cross-polytope, deltahedron, Hanner polytope, octahedron, Platonic solid, regular polyhedron, simplicial
- Faces: 8 equilateral triangles
- Edges: 12
- Vertices: 6
- Schläfli symbol: $\{3,4\}$
- Symmetry group: octahedral symmetry
- Dihedral angle (degrees): 109.47°
- Dual polyhedron: cube
- Properties: composite, convex, isohedral, isogonal, isotoxal

In geometry, a regular octahedron is an eight-sided polyhedron with equilateral triangles as its faces. Known for its highly symmetrical form, the regular octahedron is a Platonic solid, and more generally, a regular polyhedron. If the faces are isosceles triangles, the regular octahedron becomes a square bipyramid. The regular octahedron is an example of many classifications as deltahedron and simplicial polyhedron.

Regular octahedra occur in nature and science, such as the crystal structures and in stereochemistry as a resemblance of a chemical molecule known as octahedral molecular geometry. Other appearances are in popular culture and music theory. It can be the core of polyhedra construction, and it can tile with different polyhedra to create a honeycomb.

The vertices and edges of a regular octahedron give rise to a graph, a discrete structure drawn in a plane. The name is octahedral graph. The octahedral graph is an example of a four-connected simplicial well-covered graph. It is also one of the six connected graphs in which the neighborhood of every vertex is a cycle of length four or five. Within this structure, the graph forms a topological surface called a Whitney triangulation.

== Properties ==
A regular octahedron is a polyhedron with eight equilateral triangles. Each vertex is the meet of four edges and four faces. Hence, the regular octahedron has eight faces, twelve edges and six vertices. It is a convex polyhedron, and like any convex polyhedron, it has Euler's characteristic of 2, according to the formula $V - E + F = 2$; the three letters denote respectively the number of vertices, edges, and faces.

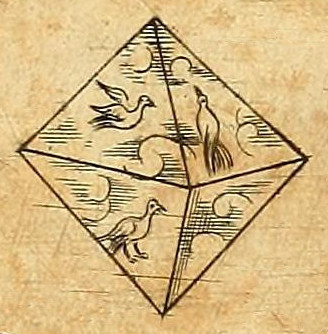
Sketch of a regular octahedron by Johannes Kepler

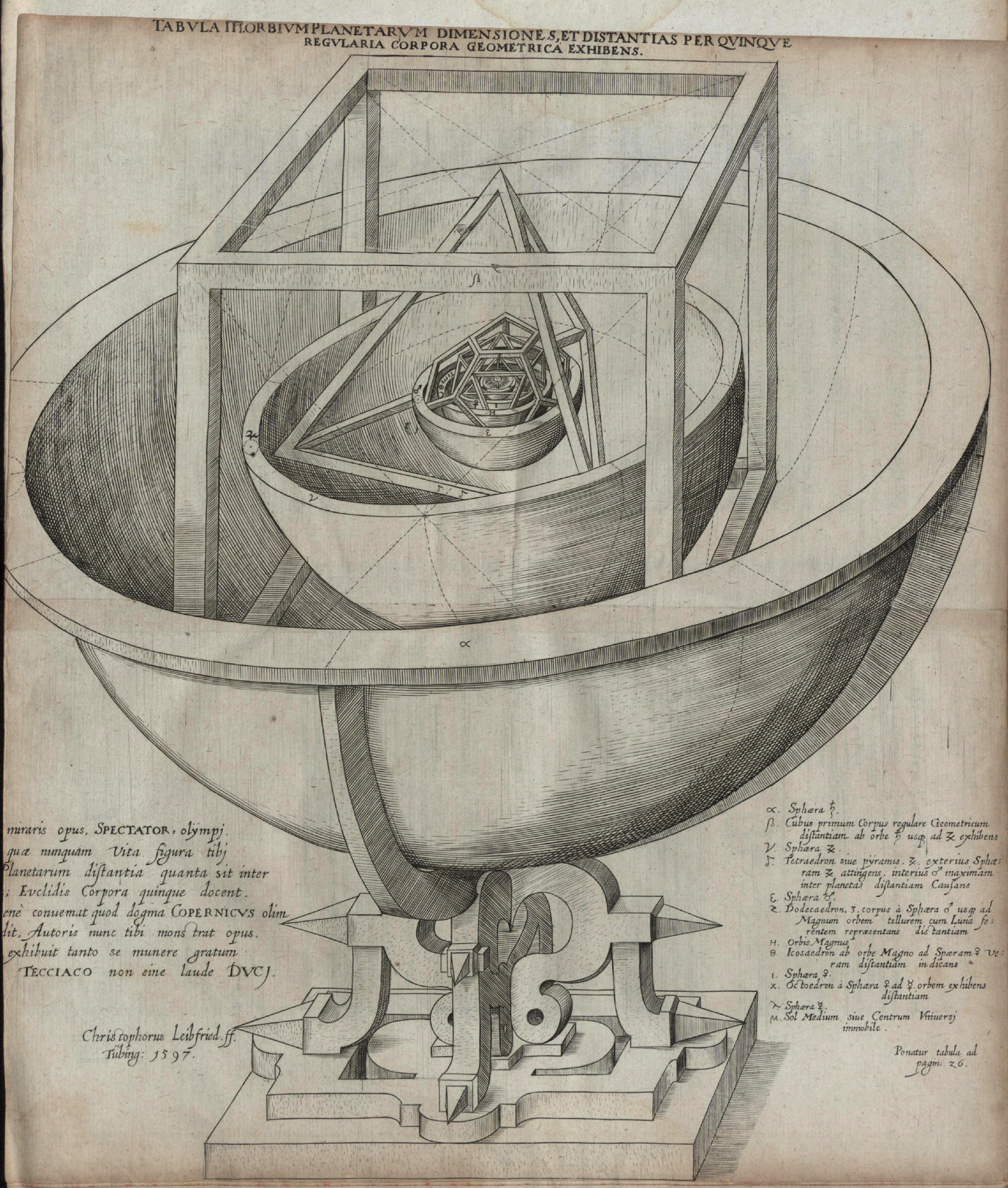
Kepler's Platonic solid model of the Solar System

A regular octahedron is one of the Platonic solids, a set of convex polyhedra whose faces are congruent regular polygons. Platonic solids are the ancient set of five polyhedra named after Plato, relating them to classical elements in his Timaeus dialogue. The regular octahedron represents wind. Following his attribution with nature, Johannes Kepler in his Harmonices Mundi sketched each of the Platonic solids. In his Mysterium Cosmographicum, Kepler also proposed the Solar System by using the Platonic solids, setting into another one and separating them with six spheres resembling the six planets. The ordered solids started from the innermost to the outermost: regular octahedron, regular icosahedron, regular dodecahedron, regular tetrahedron, and cube.

=== Measurements ===
3D model of regular octahedron

The surface area of a regular octahedron $A$ can be ascertained by summing the area of all its eight equilateral triangles. For its volume $V$, one can cut the regular octahedron into two equilateral square pyramids (see § As other special cases), hence the volume is twice as the pyramids' volume by adding together. Let $a$ be the edge length of a regular octahedron, then its surface area and volume can be formulated as:
$$A = 2\sqrt{3}a^2 \approx 3.464a^2, \qquad V = \frac{1}{3} \sqrt{2}a^3 \approx 0.471a^3.$$
The radius of a circumscribed sphere $r_u$ (one that touches the octahedron at all vertices), the radius of an inscribed sphere $r_i$ (one that tangent to each of the octahedron's faces), and the radius of a midsphere $r_m$ (one that touches the middle of each edge), are:
$$r_u = \frac{\sqrt{2}}{2}a \approx 0.707a, \qquad
r_i = \frac{\sqrt{6}}{6}a \approx 0.408a, \qquad
r_m = \frac{1}{2}a = 0.5a.$$
The dihedral angle of a regular octahedron is the angle between its two adjacent triangular faces. The angle can be obtained from the dihedral angle of an equilateral square pyramid. One can construct a regular octahedron by attaching two equilateral square pyramids base-to-base (see § As other special cases). For the pyramid, the dihedral angle between a triangle and a square is $\arctan(\sqrt{2}) \approx 54.7^\circ$. Therefore, for the regular octahedron, the dihedral angle between two adjacent triangles that can be made up by such an attachment is twice the square pyramid's square-to-triangle angle. The angle measurement is also equal to the square pyramid's two adjacent triangles' angle. That is:
$$\arctan(\sqrt{2}) + \arctan(\sqrt{2}) = 2\arctan(\sqrt{2}) = \arccos\left(-\frac{1}{3}\right) \approx 109.5^\circ.$$

The regular octahedron has two types of closed geodesics. The closed geodesics are the paths on a regular octahedron's surface that are locally straight. In other words, they avoid the vertices, follow line segments across the faces that they cross, and form complementary angles on the two incident faces of each edge that they cross. These geodesics have the length of $3$ and $2\sqrt{3} \approx 3.464$.

The regular octahedron has a Rupert property, meaning another regular octahedron with the same or larger size can pass through a hole in it. The original name of this property is from Prince Rupert of the Rhine, who wagered whether a cube can pass through a hole in it. English mathematician John Wallis, who recounted the story, answered that it is possible, and the solution was improved by Dutch mathematician Pieter Nieuwland. His solution led to the geometric measurement of the largest polyhedron's hole, known as the "Nieuwland constant". Scriba (1968) discovered that both a regular octahedron and a regular tetrahedron have the Rupert property. The Nieuwland constant for the regular octahedron with a unit edge length is equal to the cube's, approximately $1.06$.

=== Symmetry and duality ===
The dual of a regular octahedron is a cube, and vice versa. The white marks × in this illustration annotate the vertices of a regular octahedron tangent to the faces of a cube. Both have the same symmetry.

The regular octahedron has three-dimensional symmetry groups, namely the octahedral symmetry. The regular octahedron has thirteen axes rotatonal symmetry: three axes of four-fold rotational symmetry (0°, 90°, 180°, and 270°) passing through a pair of vertices oppositing each other, four axes of three-fold rotational symmetry (0°, 120°, and 240°) passing through the center of opposite triangular faces, and six axes of two-fold rotational symmetry (0° and 180°) passing through the pair of opposite edges at their midpoints. Additionally, the regular octahedron has nine reflectional planes. Each of the three planes passes through four vertices on each equator, and each of the six planes passes through the pair of opposite vertices and the center of the pair of opposite edges.

The dual polyhedron can be obtained from each of the polyhedra's vertices tangent to a plane by a process known as polar reciprocation. One property of dual polyhedra is that the polyhedron and its dual share their three-dimensional symmetry point group. In the case of a regular octahedron, its dual polyhedron is the cube, and they have the same three-dimensional symmetry groups. Like its dual, the regular octahedron has three properties: any two faces, two vertices, or two edges are transformed by rotation and reflection under the symmetry orbit, such that the appearance remains unchanged; these are isohedral, isogonal, and isotoxal respectively. Hence, it is considered a regular polyhedron. Four triangles surround each vertex, so the regular octahedron is $3.3.3.3$ by vertex configuration or $\{3,4\}$ by Schläfli symbol.

=== Combinatorial structure ===
The regular octahedron drawn in a graph. Its six vertices can be grouped into three different colors (blue, red, and green). It is a complete tripartite graph $K_{2,2,2}$ and Turán graph $T_{6,3}$, as shown in the illustration.

The regular octahedron can be drawn into a graph, a structure in graph theory consisting of a set of vertices that are connected with an edge. This is possible because of Steinitz's theorem, which states that a graph can be represented as the vertex-edge graph of a polyhedron, provided it satisfies the following properties. It must be planar (where no edges are crossing each other) and 3-connected (being $k$-connected means a graph remains connected whenever $k - 1$ vertices are removed). Its graph is called the octahedral graph, and is one of the Platonic graphs. Its vertices and edges are the same as the vertices and edges of the regular octahedron, which has six vertices and twelve edges.

Six vertices of the octahedral graph can be partitioned into three independent sets, which contain different pairs of two opposite vertices. Hence, it is a complete tripartite graph, designated as $K_{2,2,2}$. It is an example of a Turán graph $T_{6,3}$. It can be represented as the intersection graph of six axis-parallel cuboids in three dimensions, obtained by thickening the six square faces of a cube, but it cannot be represented as the intersection graph of rectangles in two dimensions. Thus, its boxicity, the minimum dimension of axis-parallel boxes that represent it, is three.

As a 4-connected simplicial, the octahedral graph is one of only four well-covered polyhedra, meaning that all of the maximal independent sets of its vertices have the same size (i.e., the same number of edges). The other three polyhedra with this property are the pentagonal dipyramid, the snub disphenoid, and an irregular polyhedron with 12 vertices and 20 triangular faces.

The octahedral graph is one of only six connected graphs in which the neighborhood of every vertex is a cycle of length four or five, the others being the Fritsch graph, the icosahedral graph, and the edge graphs of the pentagonal bipyramid, snub disphenoid and gyroelongated square bipyramid. More generally, when every vertex in a graph has a cycle of length at least four as its neighborhood, the triangles of the graph automatically link up to form a topological surface called a Whitney triangulation. These six graphs come from the six Whitney triangulations that, when their triangles are equilateral, have positive angular defect at every vertex. This makes them a combinatorial analogue of the positively curved smooth surfaces. They come from six of the eight deltahedra—excluding the two that have a vertex with a triangular neighborhood.

== Appearances ==
Beyond its existence as a Platonic solid, the regular octahedron appears in many fields, such as nature and science, popular culture, and music theory.

=== In nature and science ===
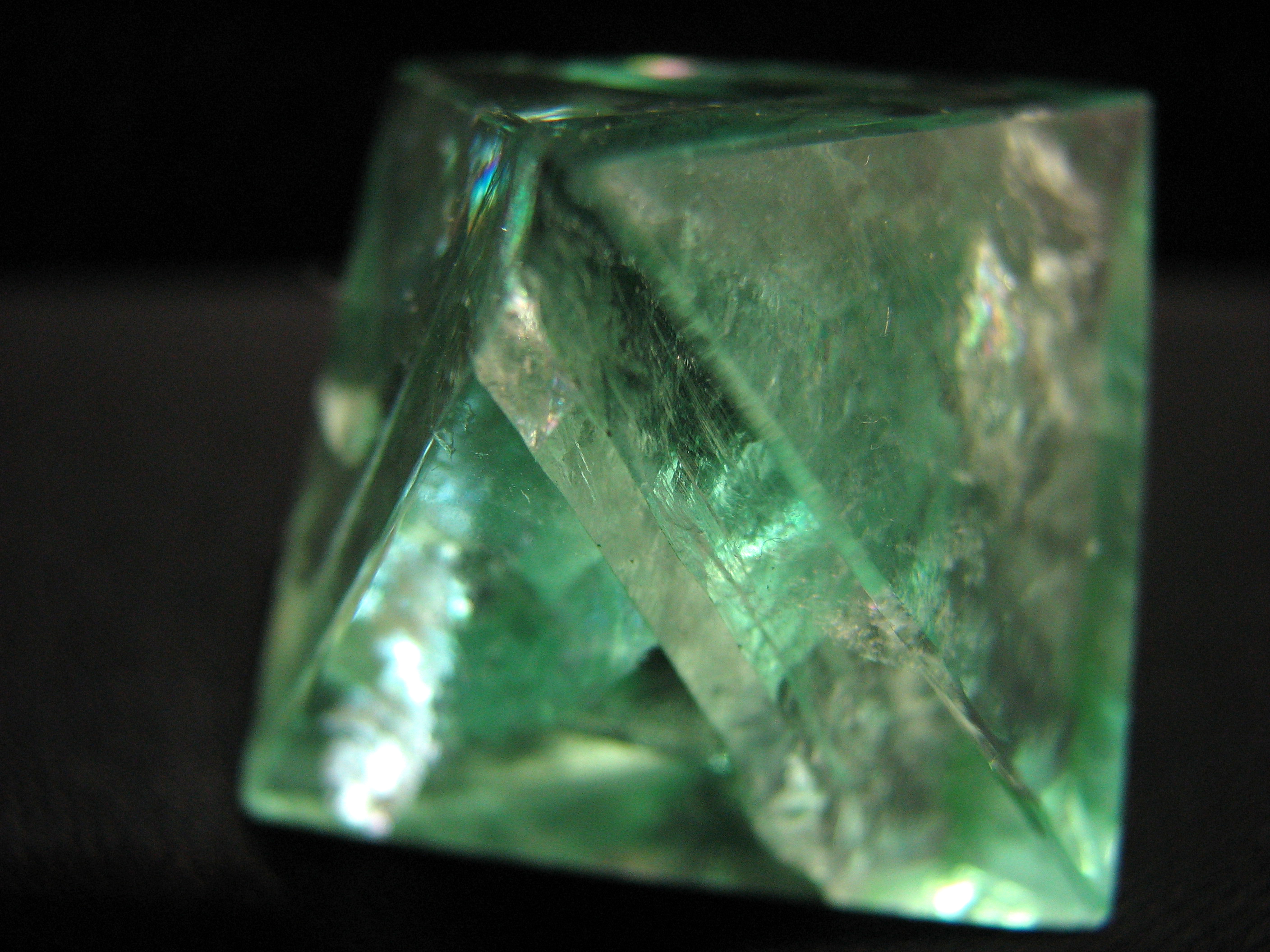
Fluorite with octahedral structure

The natural crystals with octahedral structures are commonly discovered in diamond, alum, pyrite (although there are more polyhedral structures), and fluorite. The plates of kamacite alloy in octahedrite-structural meteorites are arranged parallel to the eight faces of an octahedron. Many metal ions coordinate six ligands in an octahedral or distorted octahedral configuration. Widmanstätten patterns in nickel-iron crystals. Octahedral molecular geometry is a chemical molecule resembling a regular octahedron in stereochemistry. This structure has a main-group element without an active lone pair, which can be described by a model that predicts the geometry of molecules known as VSEPR theory. Few chemical compounds have a distorted version of the octahedral molecular structure, such as xenon hexafluoride.

The radiolarian Circoporus octahedrus has an octahedral shape.

The regular octahedron is the known solution of a six-electron case in Thomson problem, concerning the minimum-energy configuration of charged particles on a sphere. The solution is done by placing the vertices of a regular octahedron inscribed in a sphere.

=== In popular culture ===
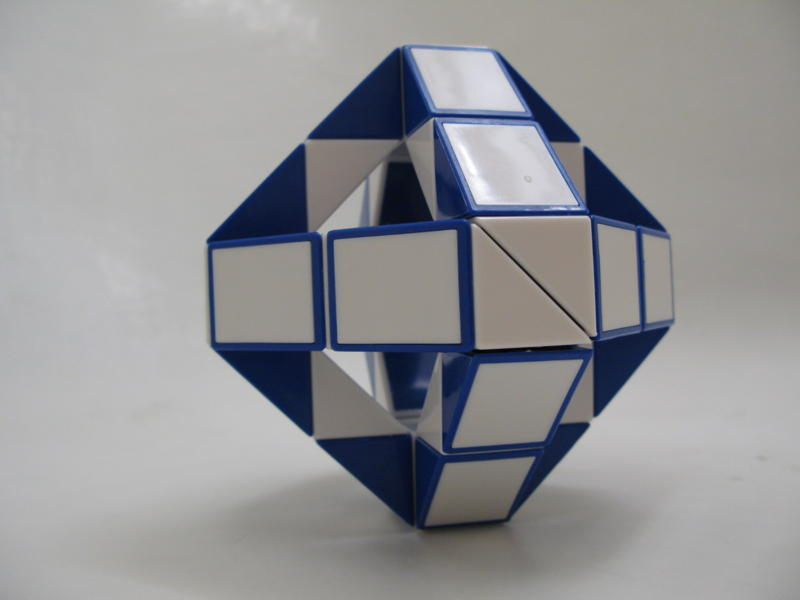
Two identically formed Rubik's Snakes can approximate an octahedron.

An 8-sided die is usually a regular octahedron. In roleplaying games, this is one of the common polyhedral dice, known as a "d8".

=== In music theory ===
The regular octahedron is used in musical tuning systems known as the hexany. Invented by Mexican–American music theorist Erv Wilson, the hexany uses the octahedron's orthogonal projection. Six musical notes can be arranged on the vertices of an octahedron in such a way that each edge represents a consonant dyad (a set of two notes or pitch) and each face represents a consonant triad (a set of three dittos).

== As other special cases ==
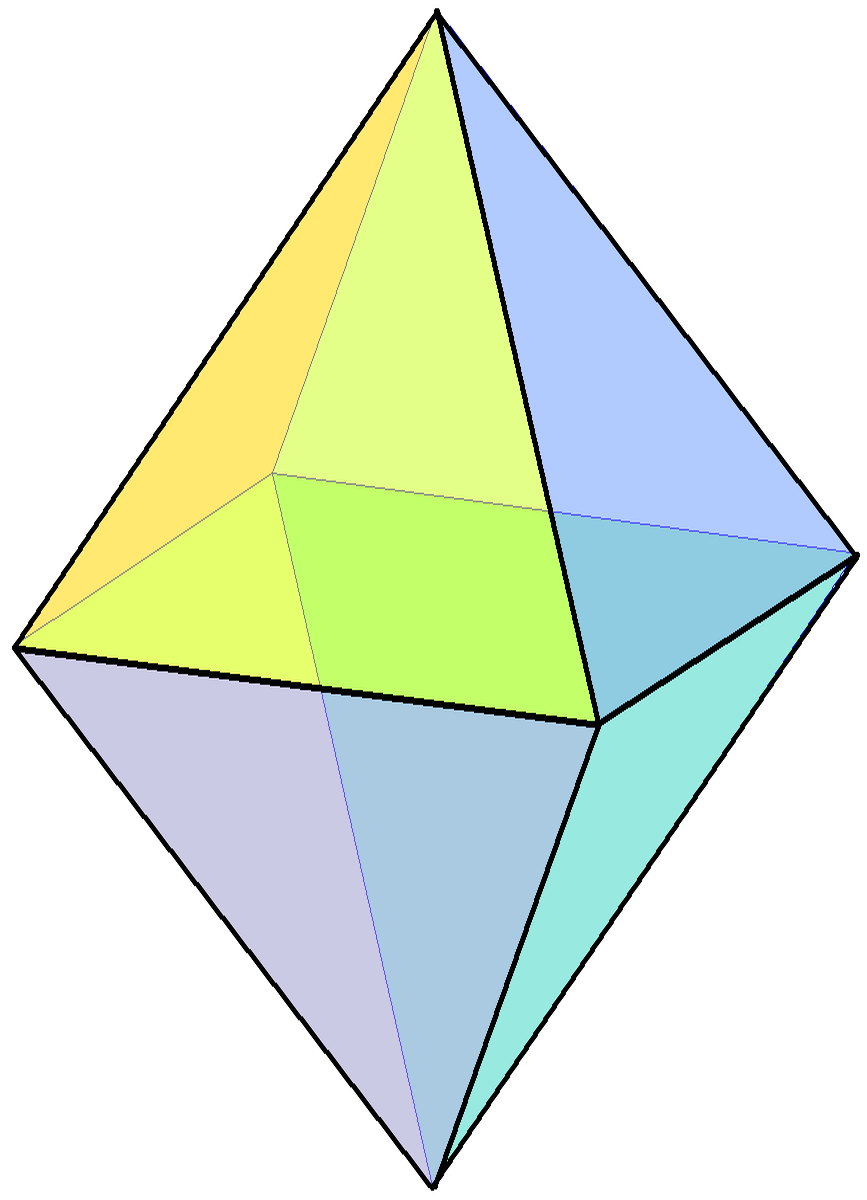
Square bipyramid

The dual of a square bipyramid, the square prism

A regular octahedron is one of the eight convex deltahedra, polyhedra whose faces are all equilateral triangles. It is a composite polyhedron constructed by attaching two equilateral square pyramids base-to-base. When the square pyramids are a right pyramid, the regular octahedron becomes a square bipyramid, wherein its faces are all isosceles triangles. In the case of a square bipyramid, its dual is a square prism. Regardless of the different types of triangles, both a regular octahedron and a square bipyramid are examples of a simplicial polyhedron.

The regular octahedron is a type of trigonal antiprism, formed by taking a trigonal prism with equilateral triangle bases and rectangular lateral faces, and replacing the rectangles by alternating isosceles triangles. In the case of the regular octahedron, all of the resulting faces are congruent equilateral triangles. The regular octahedron can also be considered a rectified tetrahedron, sometimes called a tetratetrahedron (by analogy to the cuboctahedron and icosidodecahedron); if alternate faces are considered to have different types (e.g. different colors or orientations), the octahedron can be considered a type of quasiregular polyhedron, a polyhedron in which two different types of polygonal faces alternate around each vertex. It exists in a sequence of symmetries of quasiregular polyhedra and tilings with vertex configurations $(3. n)^2$, progressing from tilings of the sphere to the Euclidean plane and into the hyperbolic plane. With orbifold notation symmetry of $^*n32$ all of these tilings are Wythoff constructions within a fundamental domain of symmetry, with generator points at the right angle corner of the domain.

*n32 orbifold symmetries of quasiregular tilings: (3.n)^{2}
Construction	Spherical			Euclidean	Hyperbolic		
Construction	*332	*432	*532	*632	*732	*832...	*∞32
Quasiregular figures							
Vertex	(3.3)^{2}	(3.4)^{2}	(3.5)^{2}	(3.6)^{2}	(3.7)^{2}	(3.8)^{2}	(3.∞)^{2}

A regular octahedron is the three-dimensional case of the more general concept of a cross-polytope.

== Related figures ==
=== In construction of polyhedra ===
The regular octahedron represents the central intersection of two tetrahedra

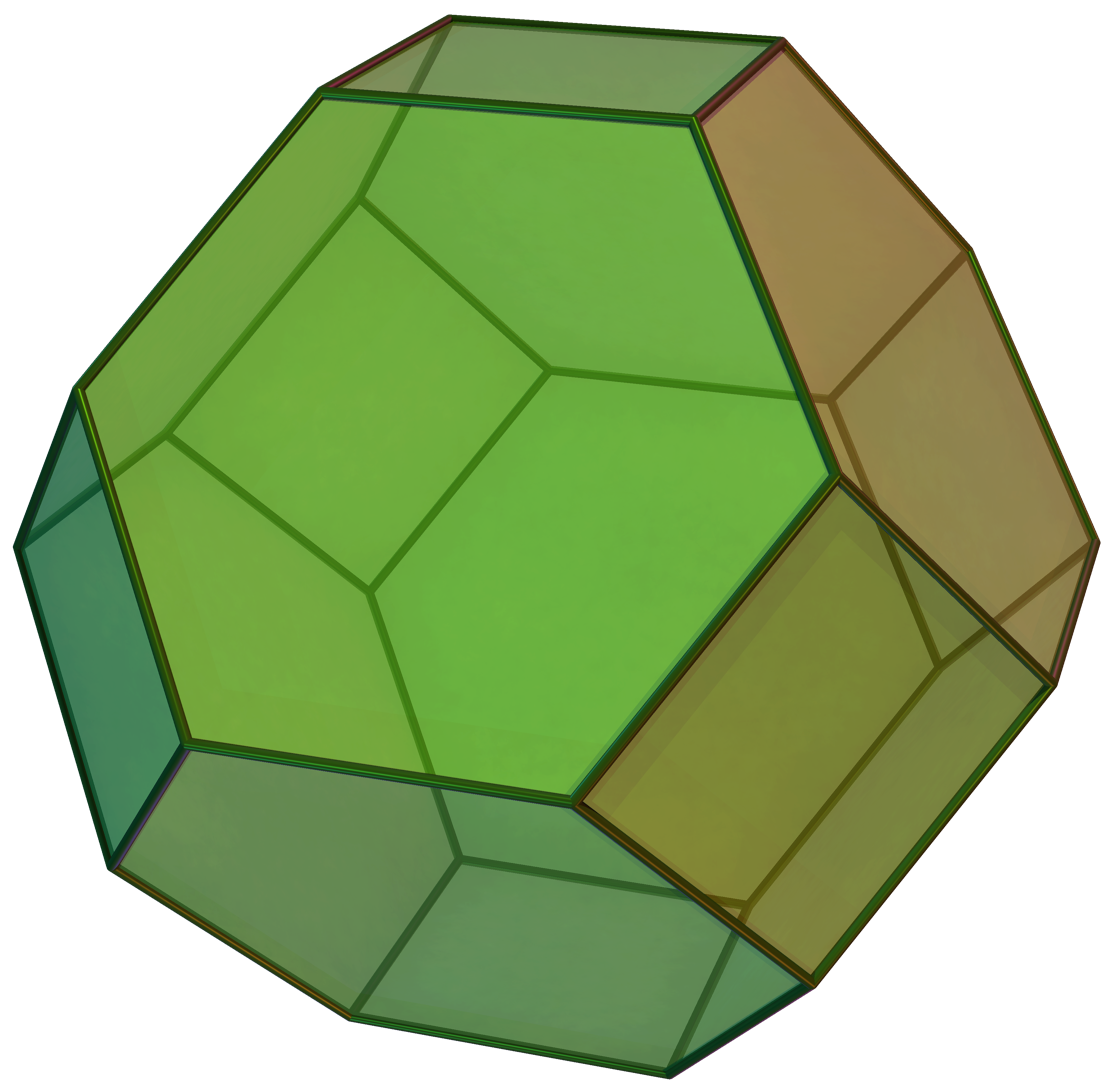
The truncated octahedron by removing the vertices of a regular octahedron

The triakis octahedron by attaching triangular pyramids on each face

Several constructions of polyhedra commence from the regular octahedron.

- The interior of the compound of two dual tetrahedra is an octahedron, and this compound—called the stella octangula—is its first and only stellation. Correspondingly, a regular octahedron is the result of cutting off from a regular tetrahedron, four regular tetrahedra of half the linear size (i.e. rectifying the tetrahedron). The regular octahedron's vertices lie at the midpoints of the edges of the tetrahedron, and in this sense, it relates to the tetrahedron in the same way that the cuboctahedron and icosidodecahedron relate to the other Platonic solids.
- The truncated octahedron is an Archimedean solid, constructed by removing all of the regular octahedron's vertices, resulting in six squares and eight hexagons, leaving out six square pyramids.
- The triakis octahedron is a Catalan solid, the Kleetope of a regular octahedron, by attaching triangular pyramids onto its faces, topologically similar to the stellated octahedron.
- The uniform tetrahemihexahedron is a tetrahedral symmetry faceting of the regular octahedron, sharing edge and vertex arrangement. It has four of the triangular faces and three central squares.
- One can also divide the edges of an octahedron in the ratio of the golden mean to define the vertices of a regular icosahedron. This is done by first placing vectors along the octahedron's edges such that each face is bounded by a cycle, then similarly partitioning each edge into the golden mean along the direction of its vector. Five octahedra define any given icosahedron in this fashion, and together they define a regular compound. A regular icosahedron produced this way is called a "snub octahedron".

=== Honeycomb ===
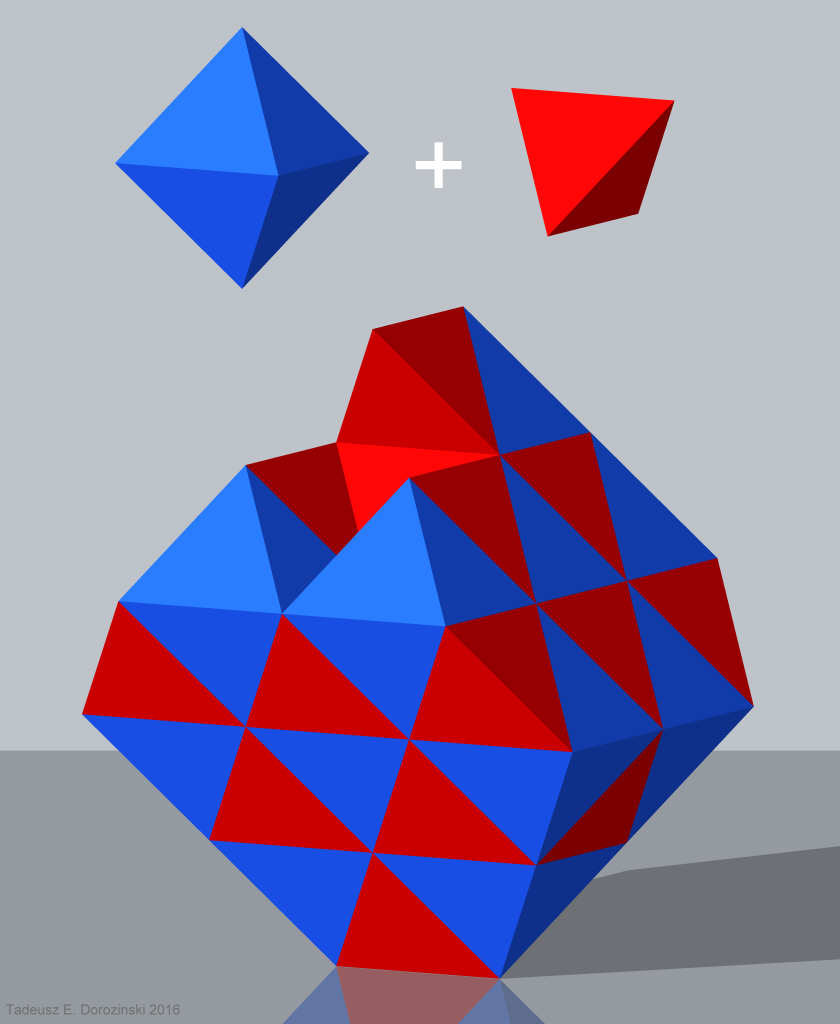
Tetrahedral-octahedral honeycomb by regular octahedra and tetrahedra

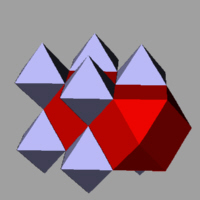
Rectified cubic honeycomb by regular octahedra and cuboctahedra

The Dehn invariant of a regular octahedron can be defined as a tensor product of the edge length and the dihedral angle of a regular octahedron,
$$12a \otimes \arccos\left(-\frac{1}{3}\right),$$
which is non-zero. Every polyhedron with a Dehn invariant of zero can tile a space with its copy by attaching its faces to another, forming a honeycomb. The regular octahedron, nevertheless, cannot tile a space. Instead, two different polyhedra that join to tile the space can have the Dehn invariant of zero. In the case of a regular octahedron, it can tile alternately to regular tetrahedra to form a vertex, edge, and face-uniform tessellation of space, which is named tetrahedral-octahedral honeycomb. R. Buckminster Fuller, in the 1950s, applied these alternating polyhedra as a space frame, which developed the strongest building structure for resisting cantilever stresses. Another honeycomb is tesselating the regular octahedra alternately with cuboctahedra, named the rectified cubic honeycomb.

=== Miscellanea ===
The arrangement of these eight equilateral triangles is one of the eleven nets of a regular octahedron.

The regular octahedron has eleven different nets. A net is the arrangement of eight equilateral triangles that can be folded by edge-joining to become the faces of a regular octahedron.

A regular octahedron is the cross-polytope in three-dimensional space. It can be oriented and scaled so that its axes align with Cartesian coordinate axes and its vertices have coordinates $(\pm 1, 0, 0)$, $(0, \pm 1, 0)$, and $(0, 0, \pm 1)$. Such an octahedron has edge length $\sqrt2$. The regular octahedron is a Hanner polytope, because it can be constructed by using the direct sum of three line segments. Its dual polyhedron, the cube, is constructed by the Cartesian product of three line segments. More generally, every cross-polytope and its dual, hypercube, in any higher-dimensional space are Hanner polytope.

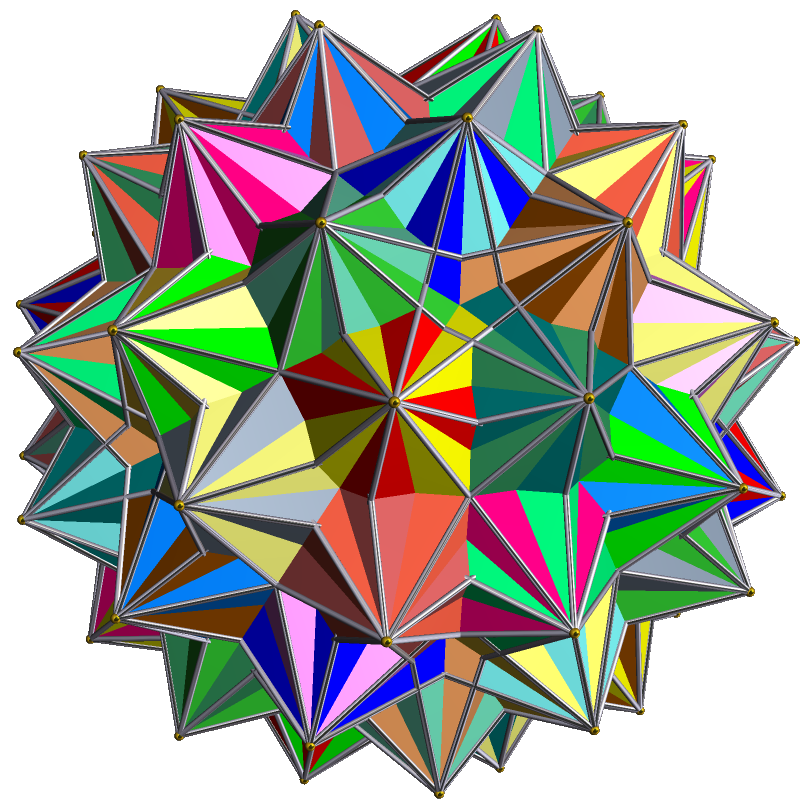
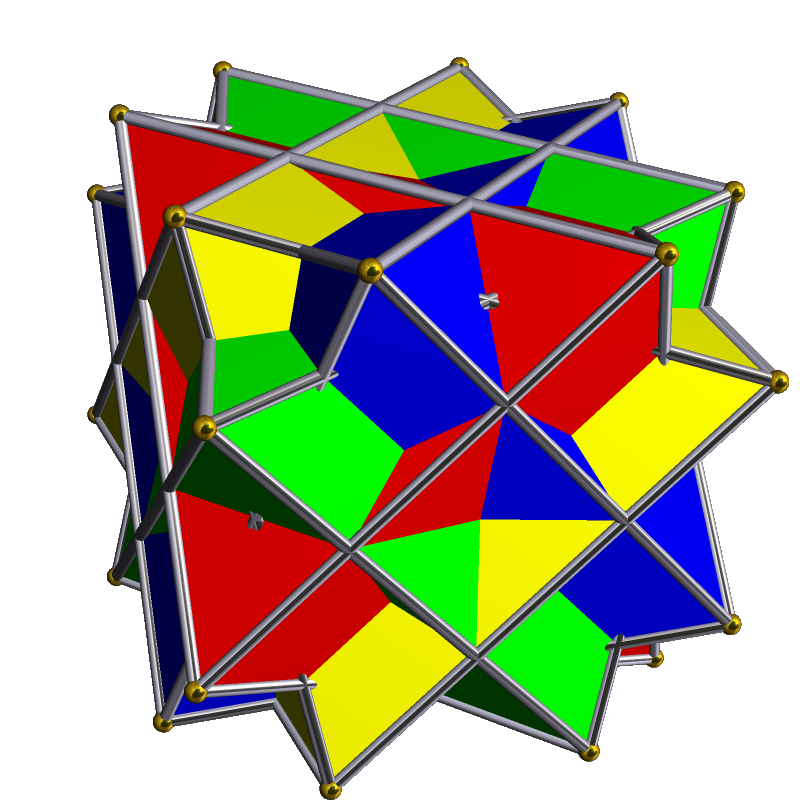
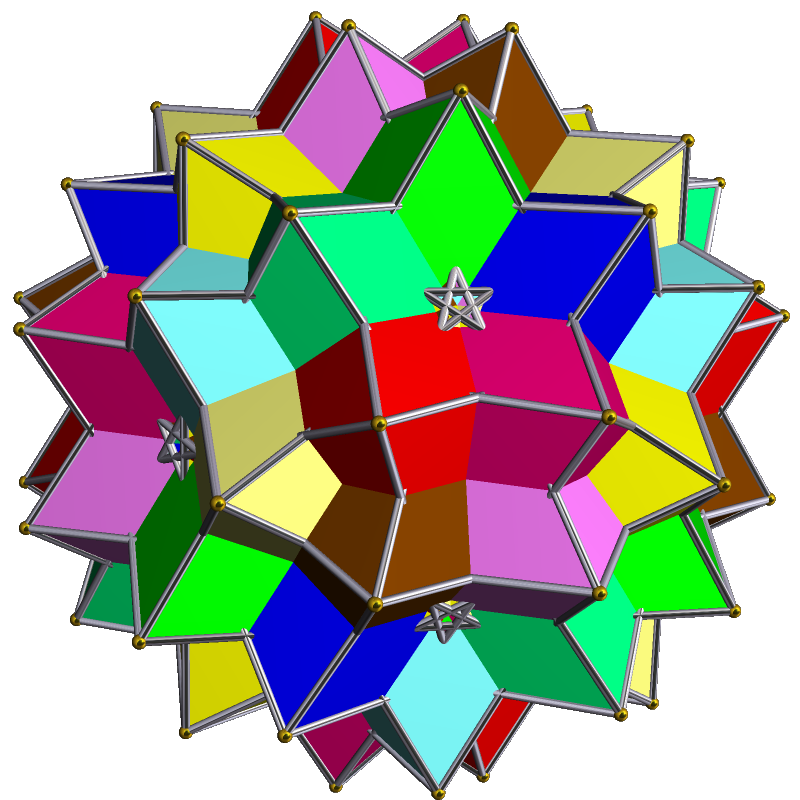
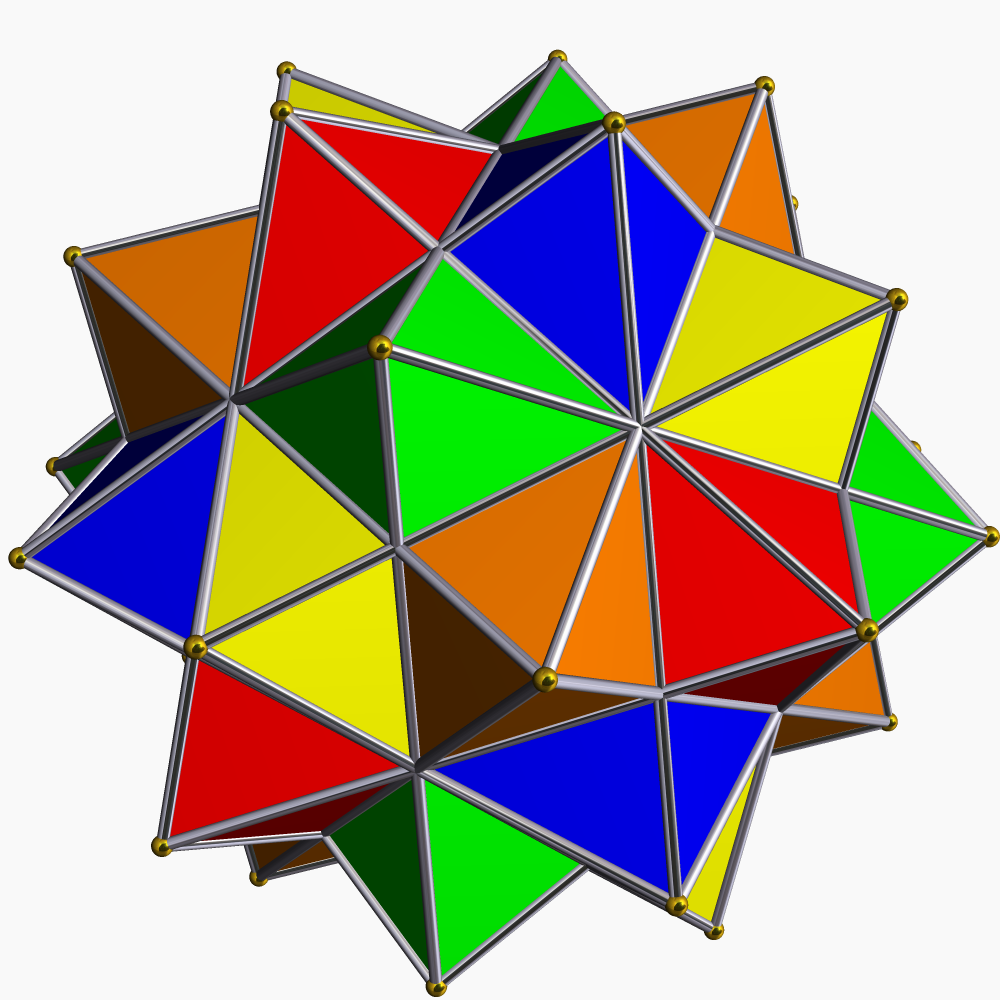
Compound of octahedra

The polyhedral compounds, in which the regular octahedra share the same centre, are uniform polyhedron compounds, meaning they are polyhedral compounds whose constituents are identical—although possibly enantiomorphous—uniform polyhedra, in an arrangement that is also uniform. The list of compounds enumerated by Skilling (1976) for the compound of four octahedra (with its rotational freedom), eight octahedra, twenty octahedra (with its rotational freedom), two different compound of five octahedra, and compound of five octahedra. The compound of three octahedra appeared in the 15th-century manuscript De quinque corporibus regularibus by Piero della Francesca in which the compound is drawn circumscribed around a cube (although it does not depict the compound), in the model photograph of 1900 Max Brückner's mathematical literature alongside the explanation of the compound, and 1948 M. C. Escher's wood engraving Stars in which used as the central figure of the woodcut a cage in this shape that containing two chameleons and floating through space.

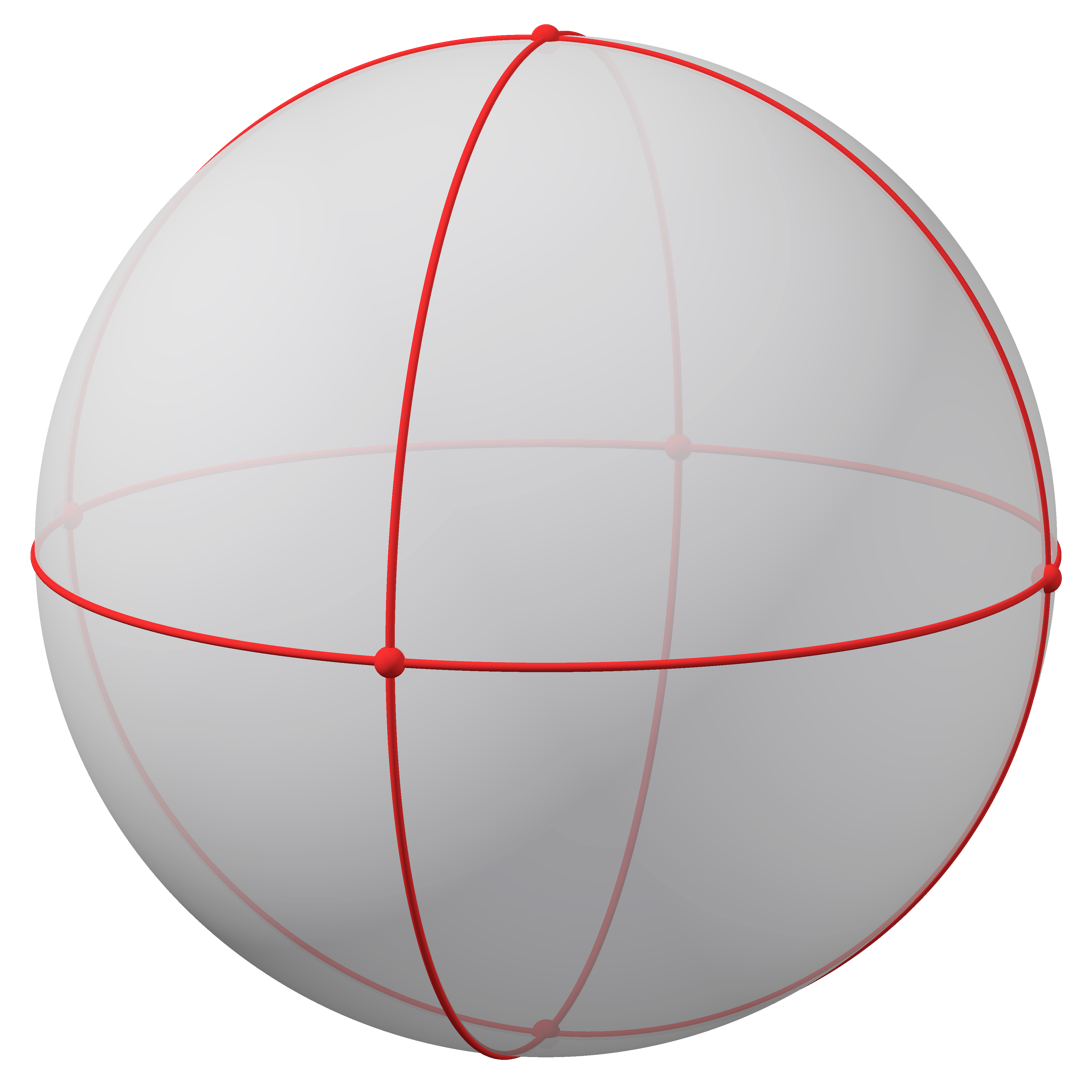
Spherical octahedron

The spherical octahedron represents a regular octahedron projected to a sphere, a part of spherical polyhedron. There are eight spherical triangles, formed by the arc of great circles. Fuller identified that there are 25 great circles.

A regular octahedron is a 3-ball in the Manhattan (ℓ_{1}) metric.

== Characteristic orthoscheme ==
Like all regular convex polytopes, the octahedron can be dissected into an integral number of disjoint orthoschemes, all of the same shape characteristic of the polytope. A polytope's characteristic orthoscheme is a fundamental property because the polytope is generated by reflections in the facets of its orthoscheme. The orthoscheme occurs in two chiral forms, which are mirror images of each other. The characteristic orthoscheme of a regular polyhedron is a quadrirectangular irregular tetrahedron.

The faces of the octahedron's characteristic tetrahedron lie in the octahedron's mirror planes of symmetry. The octahedron is unique among the Platonic solids in having an even number of faces meeting at each vertex. Consequently, it is the only member of that group to possess, among its mirror planes, some that do not pass through any of its faces. The octahedron's symmetry group is denoted B_{3}. The octahedron and its dual polytope, the cube, have the same symmetry group but different characteristic tetrahedra.

The characteristic tetrahedron of the regular octahedron can be found by a canonical dissection of the regular octahedron which subdivides it into 48 of these characteristic orthoschemes surrounding the octahedron's center. Three left-handed orthoschemes and three right-handed orthoschemes meet in each of the octahedron's eight faces, the six orthoschemes collectively forming a trirectangular tetrahedron: a triangular pyramid with the octahedron face as its equilateral base, and its cube-cornered apex at the center of the octahedron.

Characteristics of the regular octahedron
	edge	arc		dihedral	
𝒍	$2$	90°	$\tfrac{\pi}{2}$	109°28′	$\pi - 2\psi$
𝟀	$\sqrt{\tfrac{4}{3}} \approx 1.155$	54°44′8″	$\tfrac{\pi}{2} - \kappa$	90°	$\tfrac{\pi}{2}$
𝝉 (Note: (Coxeter 1973) uses the Greek letter 𝝓 (phi) to represent one of the three characteristic angles 𝟀, 𝝓, 𝟁 of a regular polytope. Because 𝝓 is commonly used to represent the golden ratio constant ≈ 1.618, for which Coxeter uses 𝝉 (tau), we reverse Coxeter's conventions and use 𝝉 to represent the characteristic angle.)	$1$	45°	$\tfrac{\pi}{4}$	60°	$\tfrac{\pi}{3}$
𝟁	$\sqrt{\tfrac{1}{3}} \approx 0.577$	35°15′52″	$\kappa$	45°	$\tfrac{\pi}{4}$
$_0R/l$	$\sqrt{2} \approx 1.414$				
$_1R/l$	$1$				
$_2R/l$	$\sqrt{\tfrac{2}{3}} \approx 0.816$				
$\kappa$		35°15′52″	$\tfrac{\text{arc sec }3}{2}$		

If the octahedron has edge length 𝒍 = 2, its characteristic tetrahedron's six edges have lengths $\sqrt{\tfrac{4}{3}}$, $1$, $\sqrt{\tfrac{1}{3}}$ around its exterior right-triangle face (the edges opposite the characteristic angles 𝟀, 𝝉, 𝟁), plus $\sqrt{2}$, $1$, $\sqrt{\tfrac{2}{3}}$ (edges that are the characteristic radii of the octahedron). The 3-edge path along orthogonal edges of the orthoscheme is $1$, $\sqrt{\tfrac{1}{3}}$, $\sqrt{\tfrac{2}{3}}$, first from an octahedron vertex to an octahedron edge center, then turning 90° to an octahedron face center, then turning 90° to the octahedron center. The orthoscheme has four dissimilar right triangle faces. The exterior face is a 90-60-30 triangle, which is one-sixth of an octahedron face. The three faces interior to the octahedron are: a 45-90-45 triangle with edges $1$, $\sqrt{2}$, $1$, a right triangle with edges $\sqrt{\tfrac{1}{3}}$, $1$, $\sqrt{\tfrac{2}{3}}$, and a right triangle with edges $\sqrt{\tfrac{4}{3}}$, $\sqrt{2}$, $\sqrt{\tfrac{2}{3}}$.

== See also ==
- Borromean rings#Hyperbolic geometry
- Centered octahedral number, figurate number that counts the points of a three-dimensional integer lattice that lie inside a regular octahedron centered at the origin;
- Hexakis octahedron, another polyhedron's construction involving the regular octahedron's commencement;
- Face Turning Octahedron
- Hirsch conjecture, a polyhedral combinatorics conjecture that is proved to be false.
- Ideal polyhedron
- Octahedral number, figurate number that represents the number of spheres in a regular octahedron formed from close-packed spheres;
- Octahedral prism, an example of a four-dimensional polytope;
- Octahedral sphere, spherical shape of a cross-polytope;
- Skewb Diamond, an octahedral version of Rubik's cube
- Superellipsoid, a solid whose horizontal sections are of the same squareness.

Fundamental convex regular and uniform polytopes
Family	A_{n}	B_{n}	I_{2}(p) / D_{n}	E_{6} / E_{7} / E_{8} / F_{4} / G_{2}	H_{n}
Regular polygon	Triangle	Square	p-gon	Hexagon	Pentagon
Uniform polyhedron	Tetrahedron	Octahedron • Cube	Demicube		Dodecahedron • Icosahedron
Uniform polychoron	Pentachoron	16-cell • Tesseract	Demitesseract	24-cell	120-cell • 600-cell
Uniform 5-polytope	5-simplex	5-orthoplex • 5-cube	5-demicube		
Uniform 6-polytope	6-simplex	6-orthoplex • 6-cube	6-demicube	1_{22} • 2_{21}	
Uniform 7-polytope	7-simplex	7-orthoplex • 7-cube	7-demicube	1_{32} • 2_{31} • 3_{21}	
Uniform 8-polytope	8-simplex	8-orthoplex • 8-cube	8-demicube	1_{42} • 2_{41} • 4_{21}	
Uniform n-polytope	n-simplex	n-orthoplex • n-cube	n-demicube	1_{k2} • 2_{k1} • k_{21}	n-pentagonal polytope
Topics: Polytope families • Regular polytope • List of regular polytopes and compounds • Polytope operations
