= Compound of six octahedra =

Polyhedral compound

The compound of six octahedra has two forms. One form is a symmetric arrangement of 6 octahedra, considered as square bipyramid. It is a dual of a special case of the compound of 6 cubes with rotational freedom.

Another form is a dual of another compound of six cubes.

== See also ==
- Compound of three octahedra
- Compound of five octahedra
- Compound of four octahedra
- Compound of six cubes
