= Rhombihexahedron =

Rhombihexahedron may refer to:

- Compound of three cubes, a uniform polyhedron compound made by symmetrically arranging 3 cubes
- Great rhombihexahedron, a nonconvex uniform polyhedron with 18 faces
- Small rhombihexahedron, a nonconvex uniform polyhedron with 18 faces
