= Edmund Hess =

German mathematician (1843–1903)

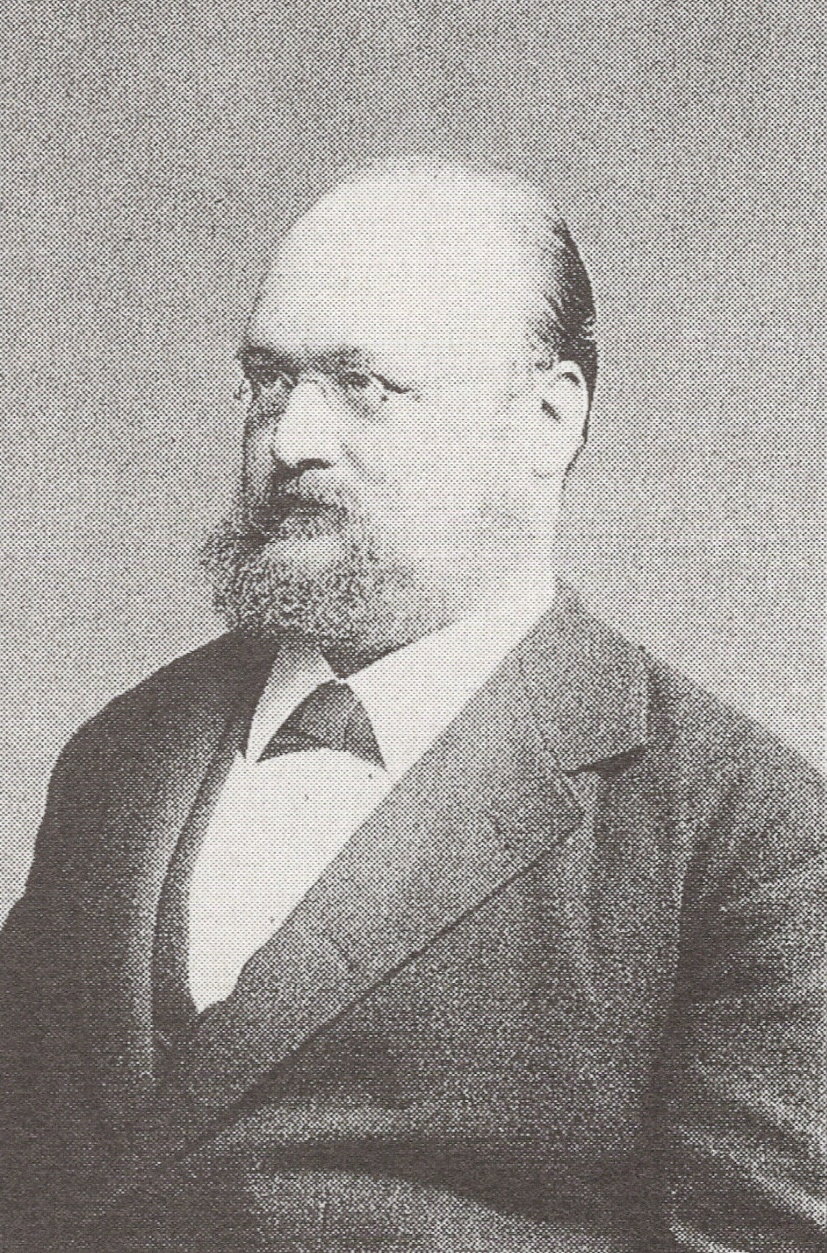
Photo of Edmund Hess

Edmund Hess (17 February 1843 – 24 December 1903) was a German mathematician who discovered several regular polytopes.

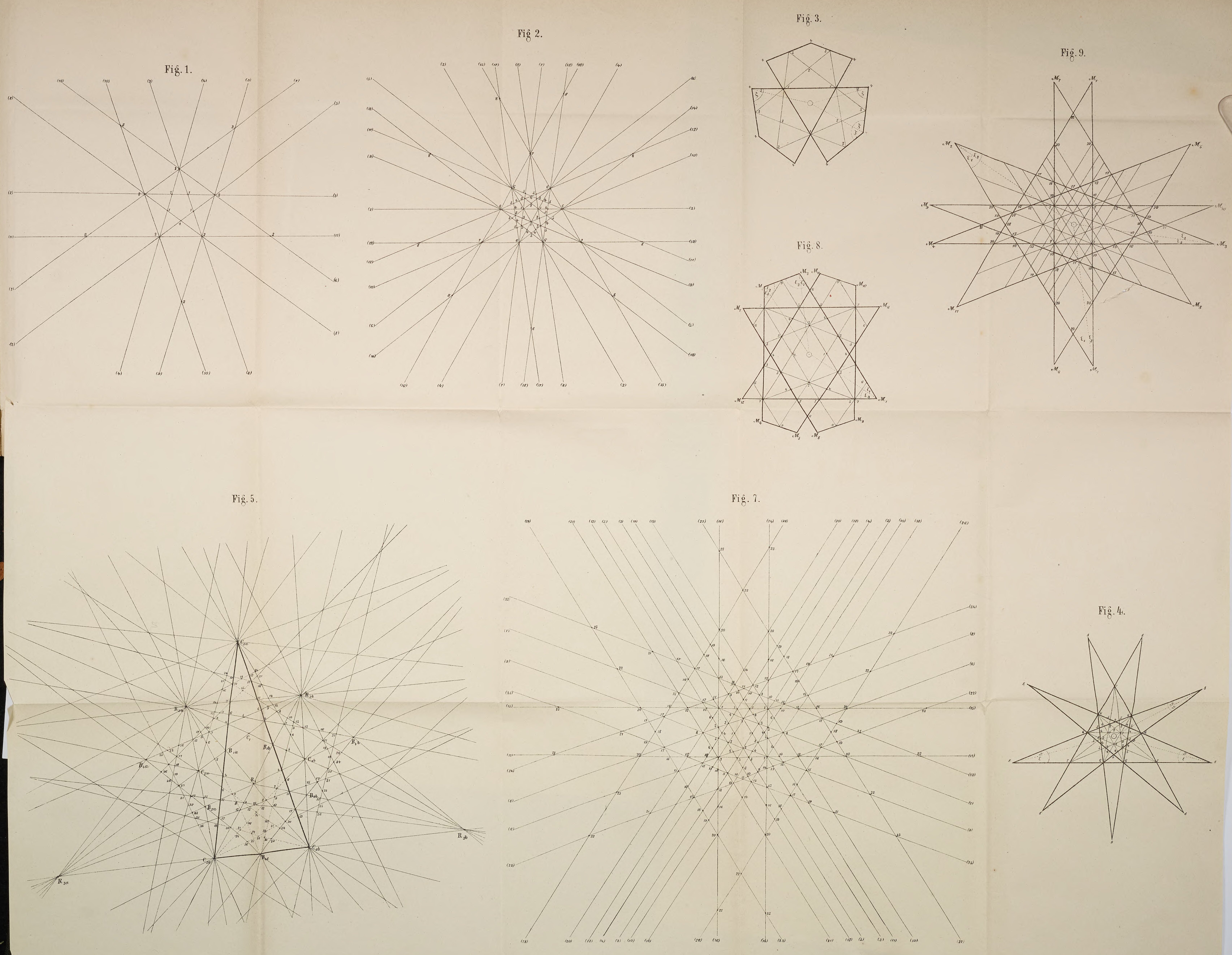
Stellation diagrams (1876) On the right are those of the compound of five cubes and its dual.

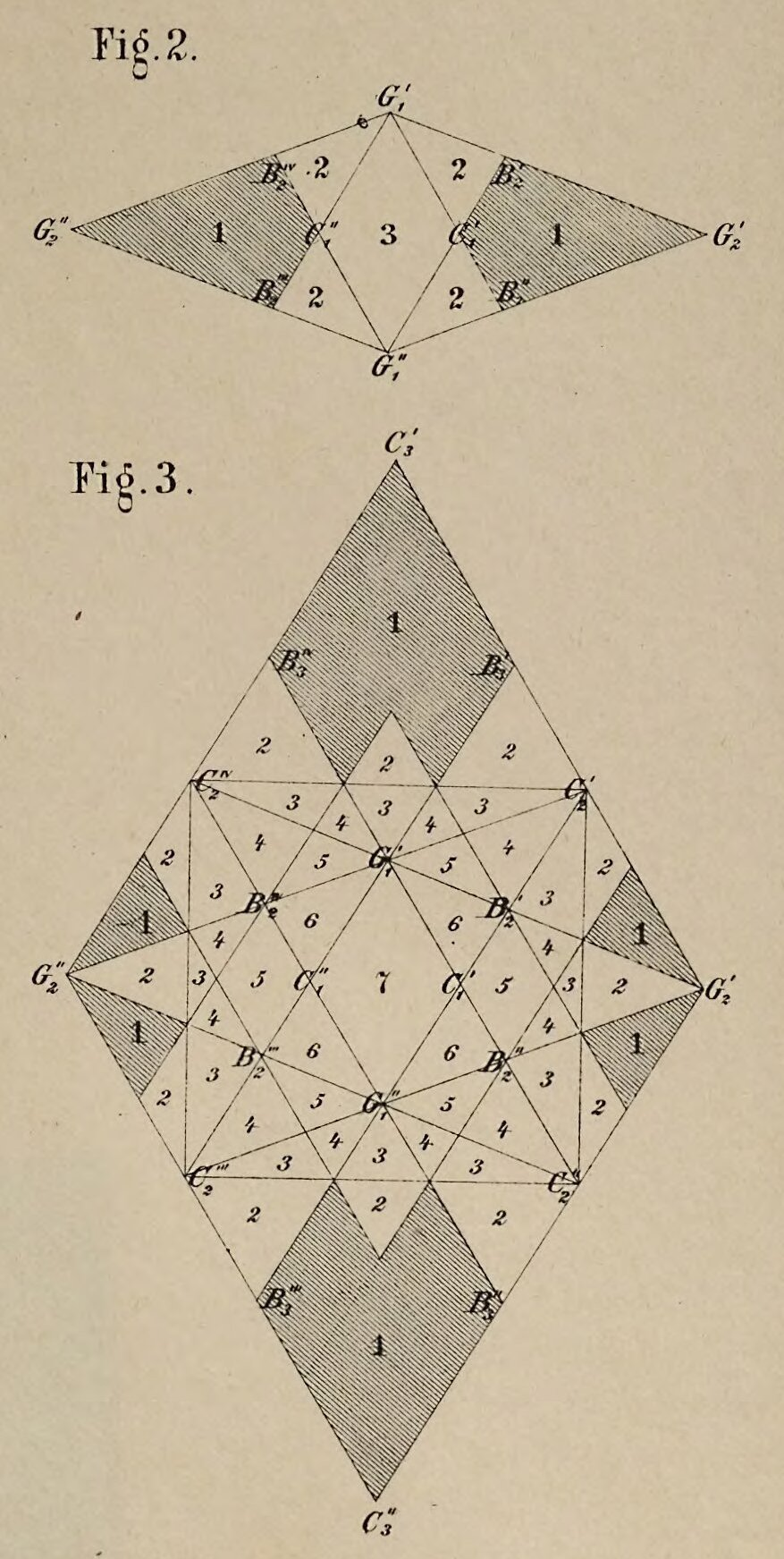
Stellation diagrams of the medial and great rhombic triacontahedron (1878)

== Publications ==
- Über die zugleich gleicheckigen und gleichflächigen Polyeder. In: Sitzungsberichte der Gesellschaft zur Beförderung der gesamten Naturwissenschaften zu Marburg (1876).
- Über einige merkwürdige, nicht convexe Polyeder. In: Sitzungsberichte der Gesellschaft zur Beförderung der gesamten Naturwissenschaften zu Marburg (1877), S. 1–13.
- Über vier Archimedeische Polyeder höherer Art. Kassel 1878.
- Combinationsgestalten höherer Art. In: Sitzungsberichte der Gesellschaft zur Beförderung der gesammten Naturwissenschaften zu Marburg (1879), Nr. 9, S. 99–103.
- Vergleichung der Volumina verschiedener Gruppen von Polyedern, deren Oberfläche denselben Werth hat. In: Sitzungsberichte der Gesellschaft zur Beförderung der gesammten Naturwissenschaften zu Marburg (1879), Nr. 9, S. 103–112.
- Einleitung in die Lehre von der Kugelteilung: mit besonderer Berücksichtigung ihrer Anwendung auf die Theorie der Gleichflächigen und der gleicheckigen Polyeder. Leipzig: Teubner, 1883.
- Über die regulären Polytope höherer Art. In: Sitzungsberichte der Gesellschaft zur Beförderung der gesamten Naturwissenschaften zu Marburg (1885), Nr. 3, S. 31–57.
- Über die Zahl und Lage der Bilder eines Punktes bei drei eine Ecke bildenden Planspiegeln. In: Sitzungsberichte der Gesellschaft zur Beförderung der gesamten Naturwissenschaften zu Marburg (1888).

== See also ==
- Schläfli–Hess polychoron
- Hess polytope
