= Compound of ten octahedra =

Polyhedral compound

Compounds of ten octahedra
Type	Uniform compound
Index	UC_{15} and UC_{16}
Polyhedra	10 octahedra
Faces	20+60 triangles
Edges	120
Vertices	60
Symmetry group	icosahedral (I_{h})
Subgroup restricting to one constituent	3-fold antiprismatic (D_{3d})

3D model of the compound of ten octahedra UC_{15}

3D model of the compound of ten octahedra UC_{16}

The compounds of ten octahedra UC_{15} and UC_{16} are two uniform polyhedron compounds. They are composed of a symmetric arrangement of 10 octahedra, considered as triangular antiprisms, aligned with the axes of three-fold rotational symmetry of an icosahedron. The two compounds differ in the orientation of their octahedra: each compound may be transformed into the other by rotating each octahedron by 60 degrees.

For UC15, the convex hull of this compound is a nonuniform rhombicosidodecahedron. For UC16, the convex hull would be a nonuniform truncated icosahedron.

== Cartesian coordinates ==
Cartesian coordinates for the vertices of this compound are all the cyclic permutations of

(0, ±(φ^{−1}√2 + 2sφ), ±(φ√2 − 2sφ^{−1}))
(±(√2 − sτφ^{2}), ±(√2 + s(2τφ − 1)), ±(√2 + sφ^{−2}))
(±(φ^{−1}√2 − sφ), ±(φ√2 + sφ^{−1}), ±3s)

where φ = (1 + √5)/2 is the golden ratio and s is either +1 or −1. Setting s = −1 gives UC_{15}, while s = +1 gives UC_{16}.

== See also ==
- Compound of three octahedra
- Compound of four octahedra
- Compound of five octahedra
- Compound of twenty octahedra
