= Compound of four octahedra =

Polyhedral compound

Compound of four octahedra
Type	Uniform compound
Index	UC_{12}
Convex hull	Nonuniform truncated cube
Polyhedra	4 octahedra
Faces	8+24 triangles
Edges	48
Vertices	24
Symmetry group	octahedral (O_{h})
Subgroup restricting to one constituent	3-fold antiprismatic (D_{3d})

3D model of a compound of four octahedra

The compound of four octahedra is a uniform polyhedron compound. It's composed of a symmetric arrangement of 4 octahedra, considered as triangular antiprisms. It can be constructed by superimposing four identical octahedra, and then rotating each by 60 degrees about a separate axis (that passes through the centres of two opposite octahedral faces).

Its dual is the compound of four cubes.

== Cartesian coordinates ==
Cartesian coordinates for the vertices of this compound are all the permutations of

(±2, ±1, ±2)

== See also ==
- Compound of three octahedra
- Compound of five octahedra
- Compound of ten octahedra
- Compound of twenty octahedra
- Compound of four cubes
