= Compound of three cubes =

Polyhedral compound

Compound of three cubes
Type	Uniform compound
Index	UC_{8}
Convex hull	Nonuniform truncated octahedron
Polyhedra	3 cubes
Faces	6+12 squares
Edges	36
Vertices	24
Symmetry group	octahedral (O_{h})
Subgroup restricting to one constituent	4-fold prismatic (D_{4h})

In geometry, the compound of three cubes is a uniform polyhedron compound formed from three cubes arranged with octahedral symmetry. It has been depicted in works by Max Brückner and M.C. Escher.

== History ==
This compound appears in Max Brückner's book Vielecke und Vielflache (1900), and in the lithograph print Waterfall (1961) by M.C. Escher, who learned of it from Brückner's book. Its dual, the compound of three octahedra, forms the central image in an earlier Escher woodcut, Stars.

In the 15th-century manuscript De quinque corporibus regularibus, Piero della Francesca includes a drawing of an octahedron circumscribed around a cube, with eight of the cube edges lying in the octahedron's eight faces. Three cubes inscribed in this way within a single octahedron would form the compound of three cubes, but della Francesca does not depict the compound.

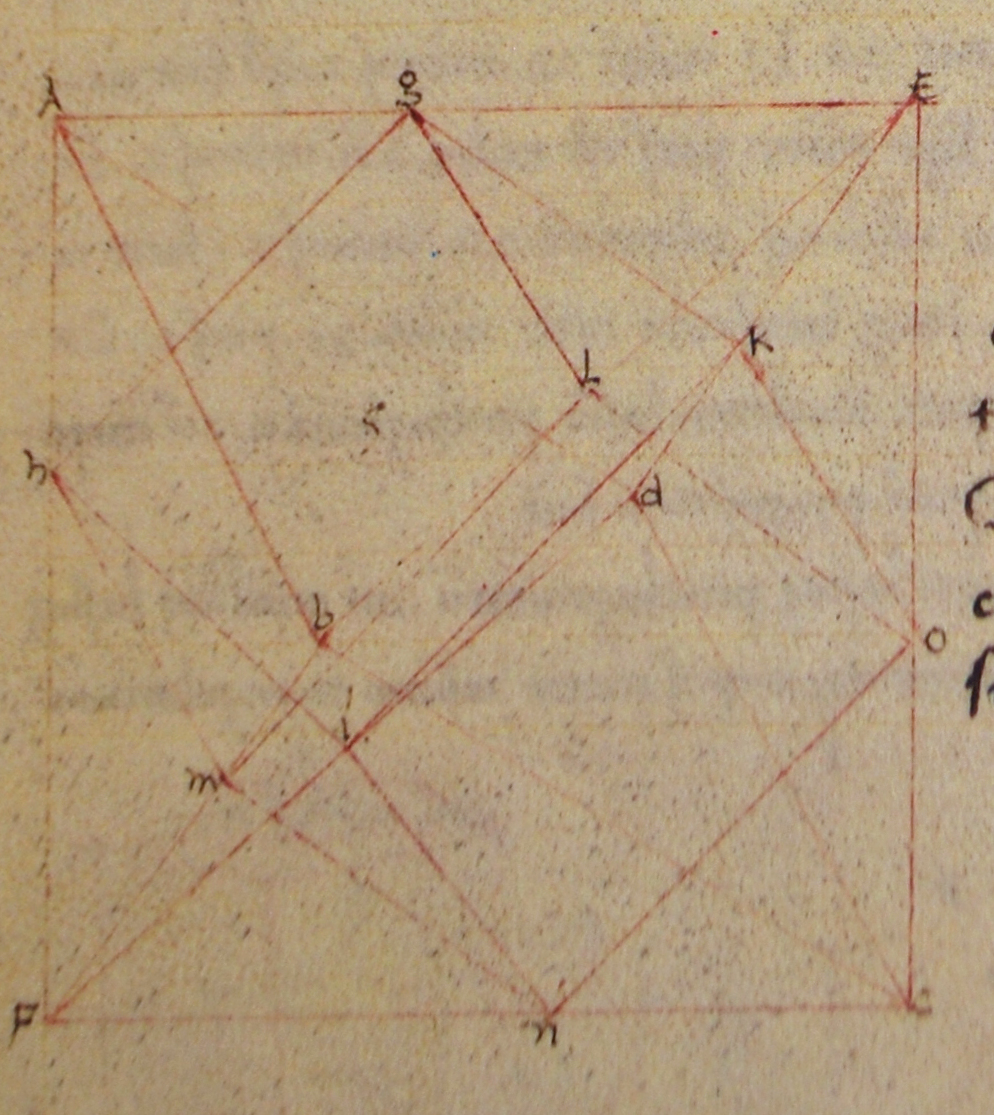
Cube in an octahedron from De quinque corporibus regularibus

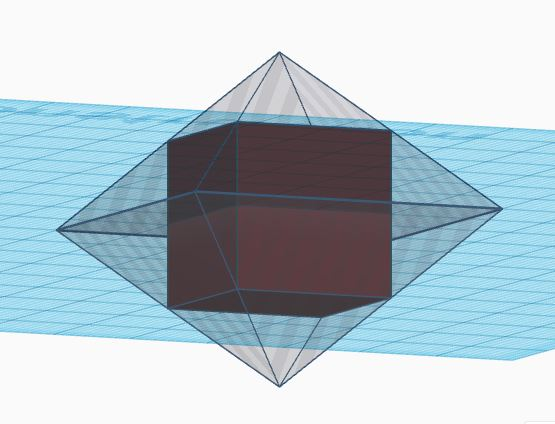
Another view of the cube in an octahedron

== Construction and coordinates ==
This compound can be constructed by superimposing three identical cubes, and then rotating each by 45 degrees about a separate axis (that passes through the centres of two opposite faces).

Cartesian coordinates for the vertices of this compound can be chosen as all the permutations of $(0,\pm 1,\pm\sqrt{2})$.
