= Compound of five octahedra =

Polyhedral compound

Compound of five octahedra
(see here for a 3D model)
Type	Regular compound
Index	UC_{17}, W_{23}
Coxeter symbol	[5{3,4}]2{3,5}
Elements (As a compound)	5 octahedra: F = 40, E = 60, V = 30
Dual compound	Compound of five cubes
Symmetry group	icosahedral (I_{h})
Subgroup restricting to one constituent	pyritohedral (T_{h})

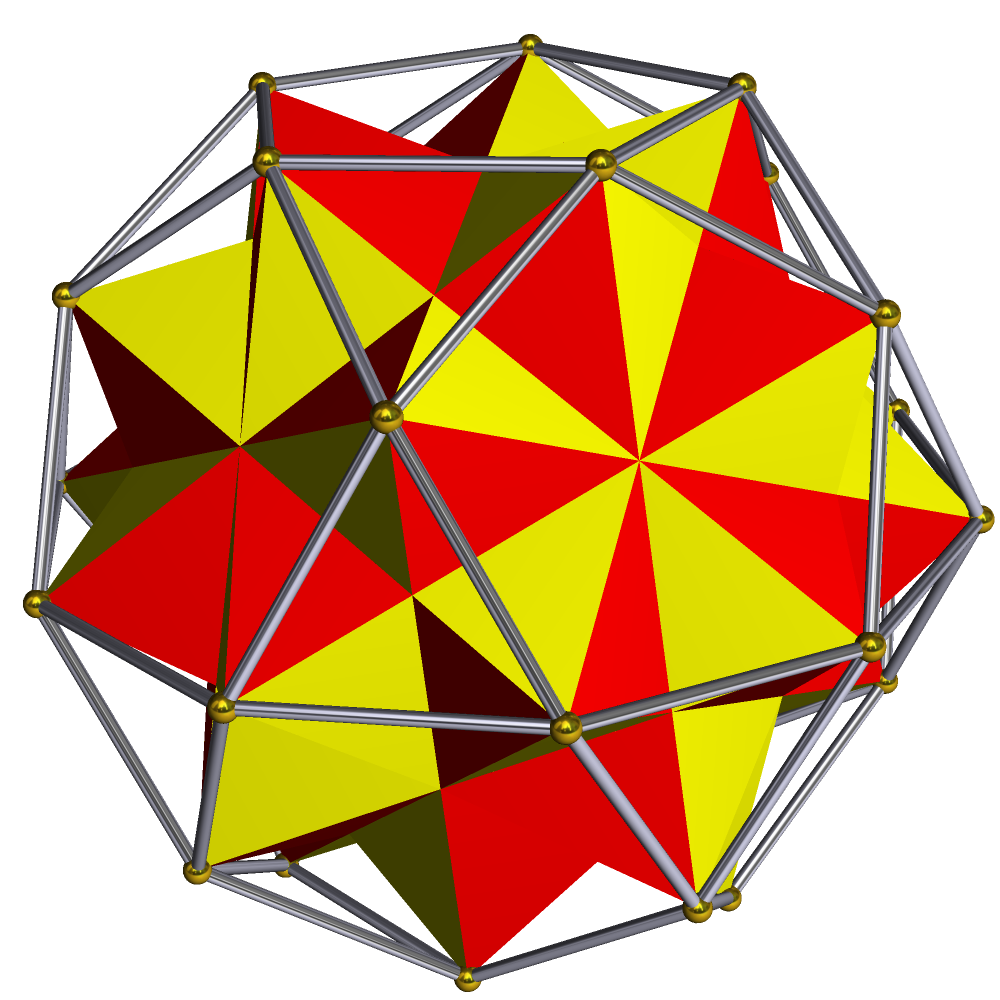
It is also a faceting of the icosidodecahedron.

The compound of five octahedra is one of the five regular polyhedron compounds, and can also be seen as a stellation. It was first described by Edmund Hess in 1876. It is unique among the regular compounds for not having a regular convex hull. It can also be called a small icosicosahedron.

== As a stellation ==
It is the second stellation of the icosahedron, and given as Wenninger model index 23.

It can be constructed by a rhombic triacontahedron with rhombic-based pyramids added to all the faces, as shown by the five colored model image. (This construction does not generate the regular compound of five octahedra, but shares the same topology and can be smoothly deformed into the regular compound.)

It has a density of greater than 1.

Stellation diagram	Stellation core	Convex hull
Stellation facets	Icosahedron	Icosidodecahedron

== As a compound ==
It can also be seen as a polyhedral compound of five octahedra arranged in icosahedral symmetry (I_{h}).

The spherical and stereographic projections of this compound look the same as those of the disdyakis triacontahedron.
But the convex solid's vertices on 3- and 5-fold symmetry axes (gray in the images below) correspond only to edge crossings in the compound.

Spherical polyhedron	Stereographic projections		
Spherical polyhedron	2-fold	3-fold	5-fold
The area in the black circles below corresponds to the frontal hemisphere of the spherical polyhedron.

Replacing the octahedra by tetrahemihexahedra leads to the compound of five tetrahemihexahedra.

== Other 5-octahedra compounds ==
A second 5-octahedra compound, with octahedral symmetry, also exists. It can be generated by adding a fifth octahedron to the standard 4-octahedra compound.

== See also ==
- Compound of three octahedra
- Compound of four octahedra
- Compound of ten octahedra
- Compound of twenty octahedra

Notable stellations of the icosahedron
Regular	Uniform duals			Regular compounds			Regular star	Others	
(Convex) icosahedron	Small triambic icosahedron	Medial triambic icosahedron	Great triambic icosahedron	Compound of five octahedra	Compound of five tetrahedra	Compound of ten tetrahedra	Great icosahedron	Excavated dodecahedron	Final stellation
The stellation process on the icosahedron creates a number of related polyhedra and compounds with icosahedral symmetry.
