= De quinque corporibus regularibus =

15th-century book on polyhedra

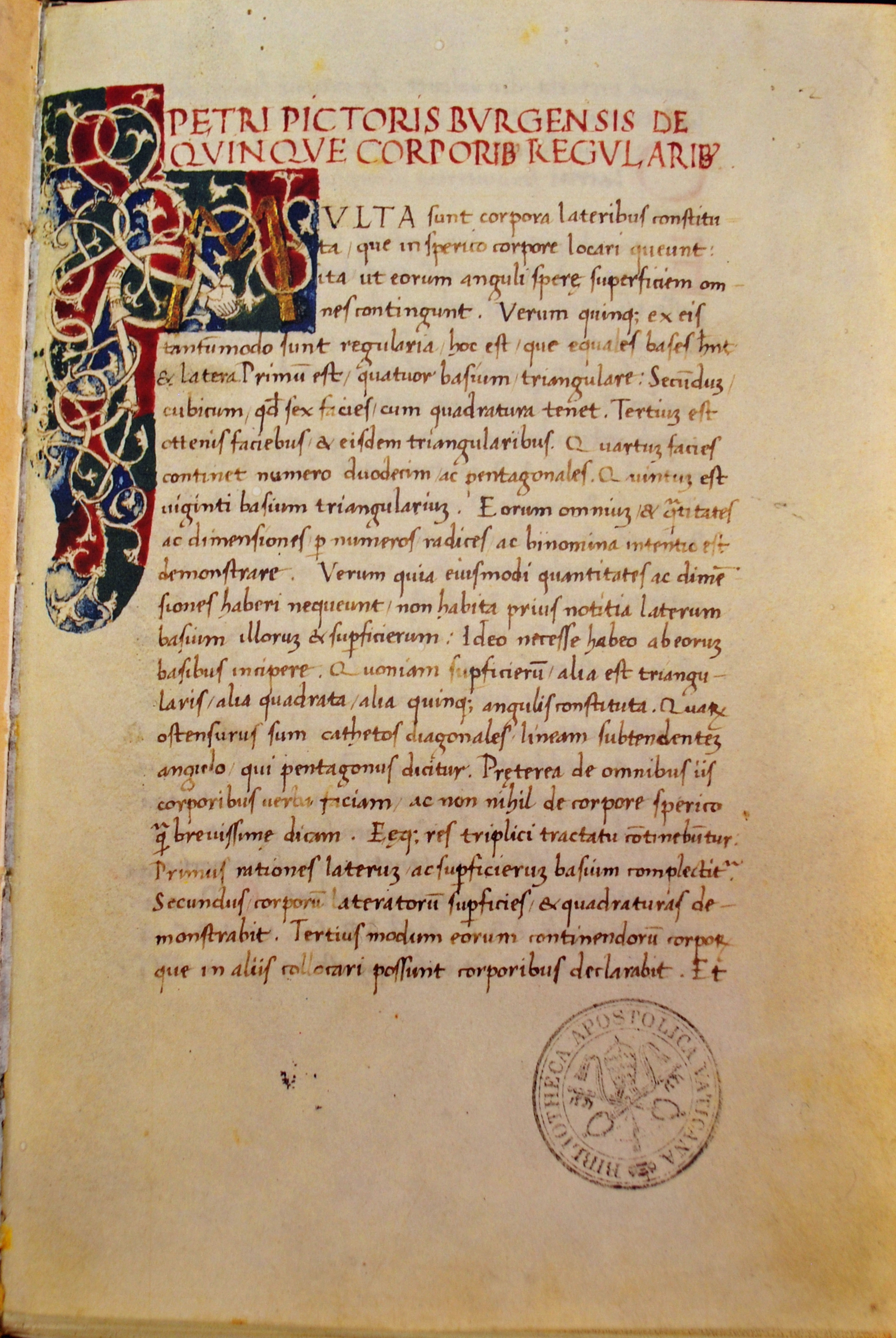
Title page of De quinque corporibus regularibus

De quinque corporibus regularibus (sometimes called Libellus de quinque corporibus regularibus) is a book on the geometry of polyhedra written in the 1480s or early 1490s by Italian painter and mathematician Piero della Francesca. It is a manuscript, in the Latin language; its title means [the little book] on the five regular solids. It is one of three books known to have been written by della Francesca.

Along with the Platonic solids, De quinque corporibus regularibus includes descriptions of five of the thirteen Archimedean solids, and of several other irregular polyhedra coming from architectural applications. It was the first of what would become many books connecting mathematics to art through the construction and perspective drawing of polyhedra, including Luca Pacioli's 1509 Divina proportione (which incorporated without credit an Italian translation of della Francesca's work).

Lost for many years, De quinque corporibus regularibus was rediscovered in the 19th century in the Vatican Library and the Vatican copy has since been republished in facsimile.

== Background ==
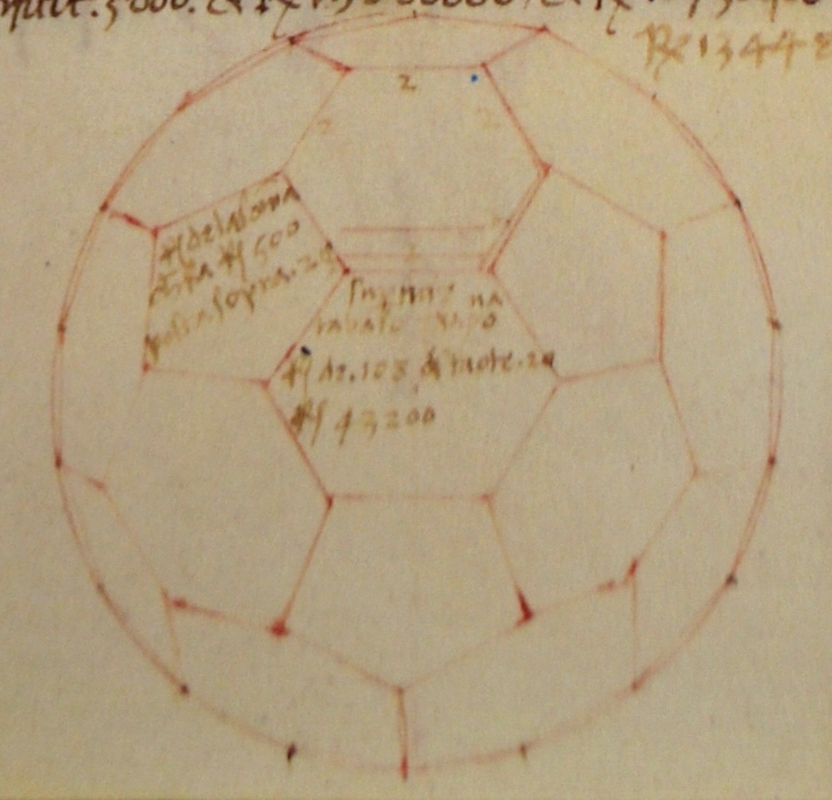
Truncated icosahedron, one of the Archimedean solids illustrated in De quinque corporibus regularibus

The five Platonic solids (the regular tetrahedron, cube, octahedron, dodecahedron, and icosahedron) were known to della Francesca through two classical sources: Timaeus, in which Plato theorizes that four of them correspond to the classical elements making up the world (with the fifth, the dodecahedron, corresponding to the heavens), and the Elements of Euclid, in which the Platonic solids are constructed as mathematical objects. Two apocryphal books of the Elements concerning the metric properties of the Platonic solids, sometimes called pseudo-Euclid, were also commonly considered to be part of the Elements in the time of della Francesca. It is the material from the Elements and pseudo-Euclid, rather than from Timaeus, that forms della Francesca's main inspiration.

The thirteen Archimedean solids, convex polyhedra in which the vertices but not the faces are symmetric to each other, were classified by Archimedes in a book that has long been lost. Archimedes' classification was later briefly described by Pappus of Alexandria in terms of how many faces of each kind these polyhedra have. Della Francesca had previously studied and copied the works of Archimedes, and includes citations to Archimedes in De quinque corporibus regularibus. But although he describes six of the Archimedean solids in his books (five in De quinque corporibus regularibus), this appears to be an independent rediscovery; he does not credit Archimedes for these shapes and there is no evidence that he knew of Archimedes' work on them. Similarly, although both Archimedes and Della Francesca found formulas for the volume of a cloister vault (see below), their work on this appears to be independent, as Archimedes' volume formula remained unknown until the early 20th century.

De quinque corporibus regularibus is one of three books known to have been written by della Francesca. The other two, De prospectiva pingendi and Trattato d'abaco, concern perspective drawing and arithmetic in the tradition of Fibonacci's Liber Abaci, respectively. The other mathematical book, Trattato d'abaco, was part of a long line of abbacist works, teaching arithmetic, accounting, and basic geometrical calculations through many practical exercises, beginning with the work of Fibonacci in his book Liber Abaci (1202). Although the early parts of De quinque corporibus regularibus also borrow from this line of work, and overlap extensively with Trattato d'abaco, Fibonacci and his followers had previously applied their calculation methods only in two-dimensional geometry. The later parts of De quinque corporibus regularibus are more original in their application of arithmetic to the geometry of three-dimensional shapes.

== Contents ==
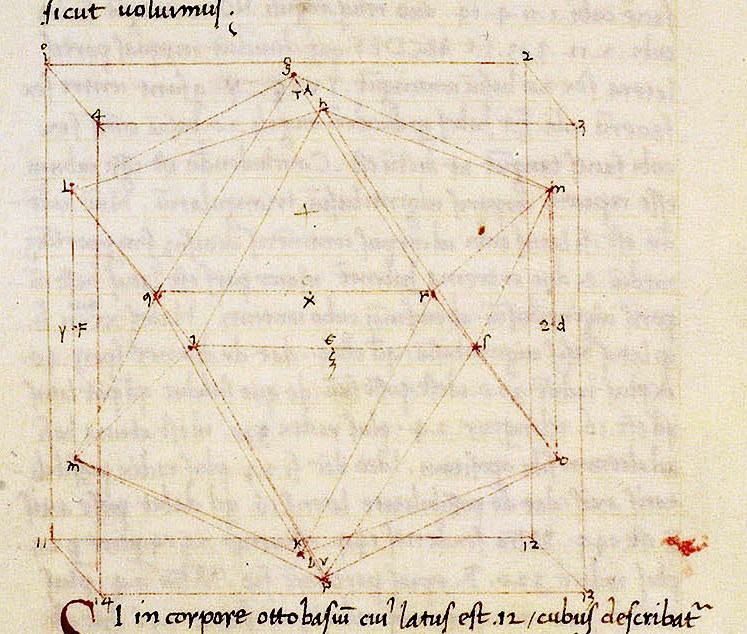
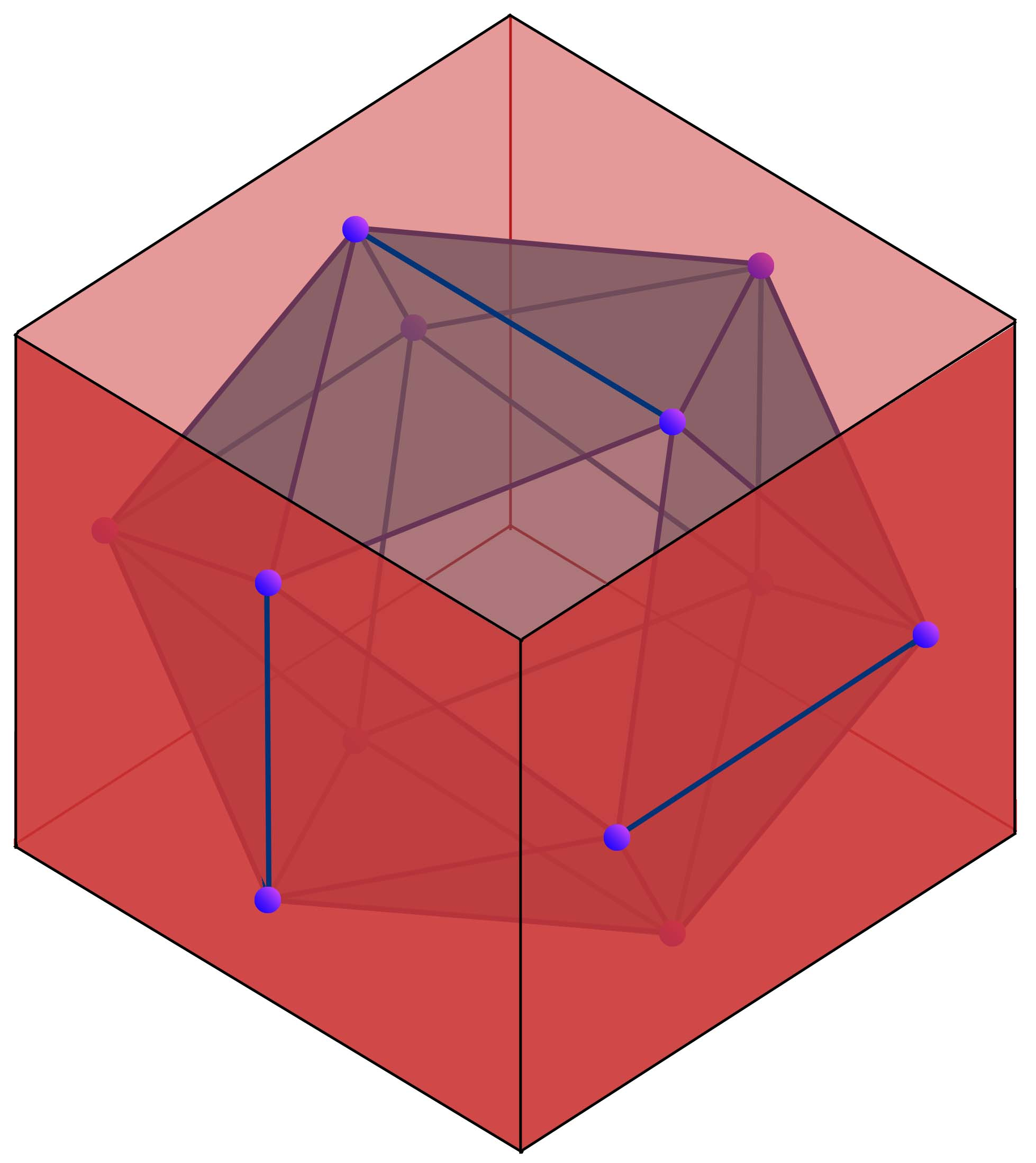
Icosahedron inscribed in a cube, from De quinque corporibus regularibus, and a modern illustration of the same construction

After its dedication, the title page of De quinque corporibus regularibus begins Petri pictoris Burgensis De quinque corporibus regularibus. The first three words mean "Of Peter the painter, from Borgo", and refer to the book's author, Piero della Francesca (from Borgo Santo Sepolcro); the title proper begins after that. A decorative initial begins the text of the book.

The first of the book's four parts concerns problems in plane geometry, primarily concerning the measurement of polygons, such as calculating their area, perimeter, or side length, given a different one of these quantities. The second part concerns the circumscribed spheres of the Platonic solids, and asks similar questions on lengths, areas, or volumes of these solids relative to the measurements of the sphere that surrounds them. It also includes the (very likely novel) derivation for the height of an irregular tetrahedron, given its side lengths, equivalent (using the standard formula relating height and volume of tetrahedra) to a form of Heron's formula for tetrahedra.

The third part includes additional exercises on circumscribed spheres, and then considers pairs of Platonic solids inscribed one within another, again focusing on their relative measurements. This part is inspired most directly by the 15th (apocryphal) book of the Elements, which constructs certain inscribed pairs of polyhedral figures (for instance, a regular tetrahedron inscribed within a cube and sharing its four vertices with the four of the cube). De quinque corporibus regularibus aims to arithmetize these constructions, making it possible to calculate the measurements for one polyhedron given measurements of the other.

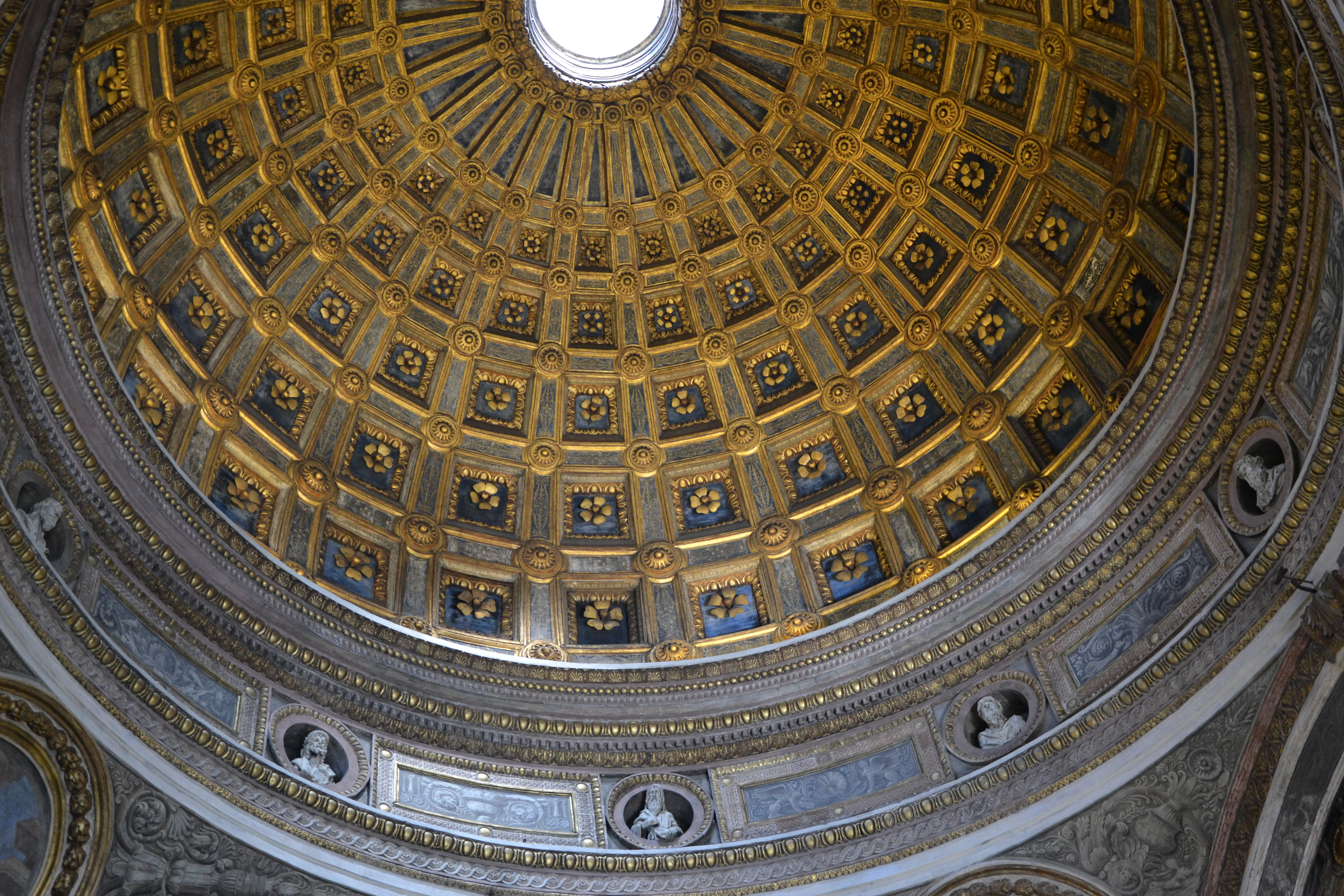
The dome of Santa Maria presso San Satiro

Intersecting two cylinders to form a Steinmetz solid

The fourth and final part of the book concerns other shapes than the Platonic solids. These include six Archimedean solids: the truncated tetrahedron (which appears also in an exercise in his Trattato d'abaco), and the truncations of the other four Platonic solids. The cuboctahedron, another Archimedean solid, is described in the Trattato but not in De quinque corporibus regularibus; since De quinque corporibus regularibus appears to be a later work than the Trattato, this omission appears to be deliberate, and a sign that della Francesca was not aiming for a complete listing of these polyhedra. The fourth part of De quinque corporibus regularibus also includes domed shapes like the domes of the Pantheon, Rome or the (at the time newly constructed) Santa Maria presso San Satiro in Milan formed from a ring of triangles surrounded by concentric rings of irregular quadrilaterals, and other shapes arising in architectural applications. The result that Peterson (1997) calls della Francesca's "most sophisticated" is the derivation of the volume of a Steinmetz solid (the intersection of two cylinders, the shape of a cloister vault), which della Francesca had illustrated in his book on perspective. Despite its curves, this shape has a simple but non-obvious formula for its volume, 2/3 of the volume of its enclosing cube. This result was known to both Archimedes and, in ancient China, Zu Chongzhi, but della Francesca was unaware of either prior discovery.

De quinque corporibus regularibus is illustrated in a variety of styles by della Francesca, not all of which are in correct mathematical perspective. It includes many exercises, roughly half of which overlap with the geometric parts of della Francesca's Trattato d'abaco, translated from the Italian of the Trattato to the Latin of the De quinque corporibus regularibus.

== Dissemination ==
Della Francesca dedicated De quinque corporibus regularibus to Guidobaldo da Montefeltro, the Duke of Urbino. Although the book is not dated, this dedication narrows the date of its completion to the range from 1482 when Guidobaldo, ten years old, became duke, until 1492 when Della Francesca died. However, della Francesca likely wrote his book first in Italian, before translating it into Latin either himself or with the assistance of a friend, Matteo dal Borgo, so its original draft may have been from before Guidobaldo's accession. In any case, the book was added to the library of the duke. It was kept there together with della Francesca's book on perspective, which he had dedicated to the previous duke.

In what has been called "probably the first full-blown case of plagiarism in the history of mathematics", Luca Pacioli copied exercises from Trattato d'abaco into his 1494 book Summa de arithmetica, and then, in his 1509 book Divina proportione, incorporated a translation of the entire book De quinque corporibus regularibus into Italian, without crediting della Francesca for any of this material. It is through Pacioli that much of della Francesca's work became widely known. Although Giorgio Vasari denounced Pacioli for plagiarism in his 1568 book, Lives of the Most Excellent Painters, Sculptors, and Architects, he did not provide sufficient detail to verify these claims. Della Francesca's original work became lost until, in 1851 and again in 1880, it was rediscovered in the Urbino collection of the Vatican Library by Scottish antiquary James Dennistoun and German art historian Max Jordan, respectively, allowing the accuracy of Vasari's accusations to be verified.

Subsequent works to study the regular solids and their perspectives in similar ways, based on the work of della Francesca and its transmission by Pacioli, include Albrecht Dürer's Underweysung der Messung (1525), which focuses on techniques for both the perspective drawing of regular and irregular polyhedra as well as for their construction as physical models, and Wenzel Jamnitzer's Perspectiva corporum regularium (1568), which presents images of many polyhedra derived from the regular polyhedra, but without mathematical analysis.

Although a book with the same title was recorded to exist in the 16th century in the private library of John Dee, the Vatican copy of De quinque corporibus regularibus (Vatican Codex Urbinas 632) is the only extant copy known. An 1895 catalog of the Vatican collection lists it between volumes of Euclid and Archimedes. Reproductions of it have been published by the Accademia dei Lincei in 1916, and by Giunti in 1995.

== See also ==
- List of books about polyhedra
