= List of uniform polyhedra by Schwarz triangle =

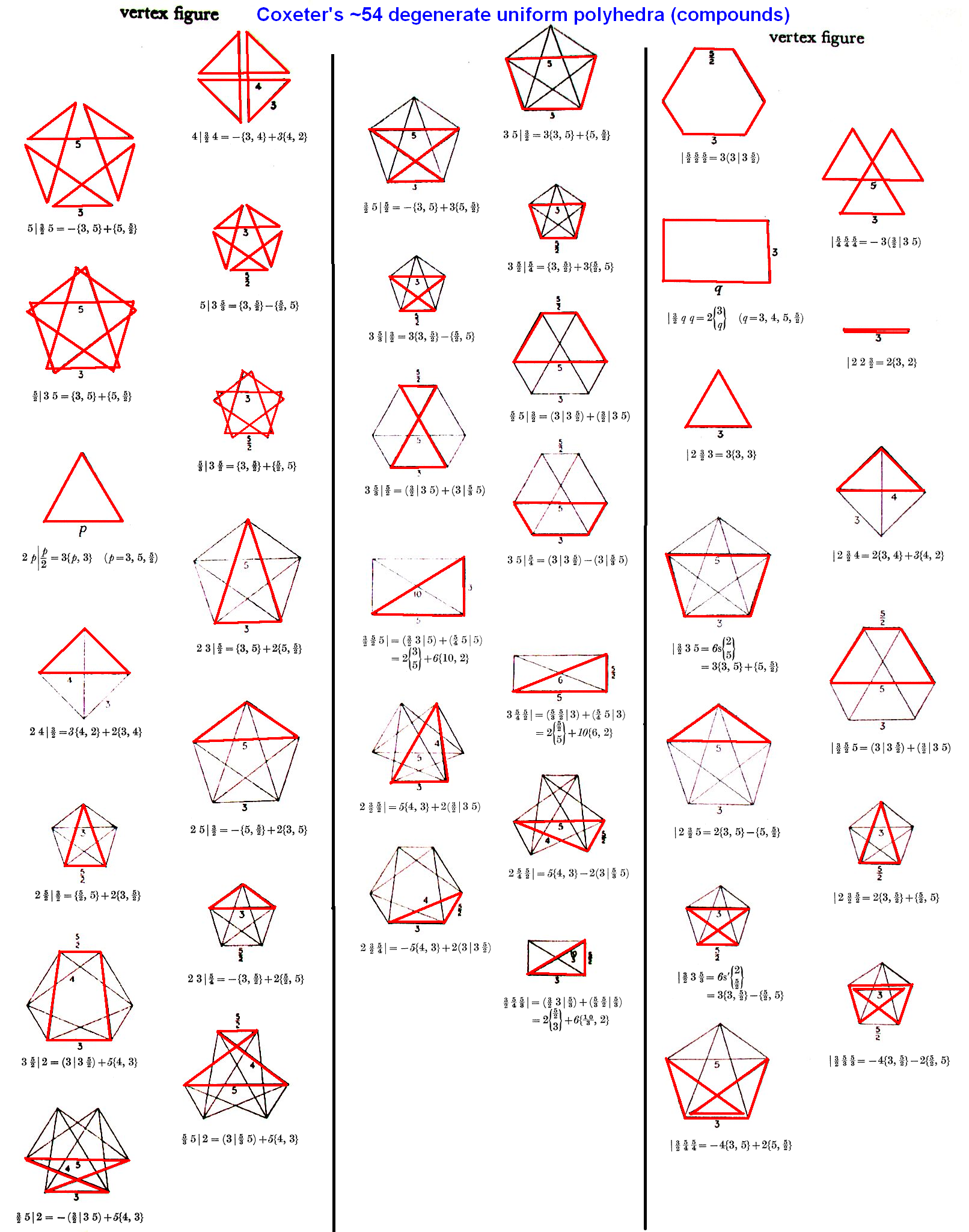
Coxeter's listing of degenerate Wythoffian uniform polyhedra, giving Wythoff symbols, vertex figures, and descriptions using Schläfli symbols. All the uniform polyhedra and all the degenerate Wythoffian uniform polyhedra are listed in this article.

There are many relationships among the uniform polyhedra. The Wythoff construction is able to construct almost all of the uniform polyhedra from the acute and obtuse Schwarz triangles. The numbers that can be used for the sides of a non-dihedral acute or obtuse Schwarz triangle that does not necessarily lead to only degenerate uniform polyhedra are 2, 3, 3/2, 4, 4/3, 5, 5/2, 5/3, and 5/4 (but numbers with numerator 4 and those with numerator 5 may not occur together). (4/2 can also be used, but only leads to degenerate uniform polyhedra as 4 and 2 have a common factor.) There are 44 such Schwarz triangles (5 with tetrahedral symmetry, 7 with octahedral symmetry and 32 with icosahedral symmetry), which, together with the infinite family of dihedral Schwarz triangles, can form almost all of the non-degenerate uniform polyhedra. Many degenerate uniform polyhedra, with completely coincident vertices, edges, or faces, may also be generated by the Wythoff construction, and those that arise from Schwarz triangles not using 4/2 are also given in the tables below along with their non-degenerate counterparts. Reflex Schwarz triangles have not been included, as they simply create duplicates or degenerates; however, a few are mentioned outside the tables due to their application to three of the snub polyhedra.

There are a few non-Wythoffian uniform polyhedra, which no Schwarz triangles can generate; however, most of them can be generated using the Wythoff construction as double covers (the non-Wythoffian polyhedron is covered twice instead of once) or with several additional coinciding faces that must be discarded to leave no more than two faces at every edge (see Omnitruncated polyhedron#Other even-sided nonconvex polyhedra). Such polyhedra are marked by an asterisk in this list. The only uniform polyhedra which still fail to be generated by the Wythoff construction are the great dirhombicosidodecahedron and the great disnub dirhombidodecahedron.

Each tiling of Schwarz triangles on a sphere may cover the sphere only once, or it may instead wind round the sphere a whole number of times, crossing itself in the process. The number of times the tiling winds round the sphere is the density of the tiling, and is denoted μ.

Jonathan Bowers' short names for the polyhedra, known as Bowers acronyms, are used instead of the full names for the polyhedra to save space. The Maeder index is also given. Except for the dihedral Schwarz triangles, the Schwarz triangles are ordered by their densities.

The analogous cases of Euclidean tilings are also listed, and those of hyperbolic tilings briefly and incompletely discussed.

== Möbius and Schwarz triangles ==
There are 4 spherical triangles with angles π/p, π/q, π/r, where (p q r) are integers: (Coxeter, "Uniform polyhedra", 1954)

1. (2 2 r) - Dihedral
2. (2 3 3) - Tetrahedral
3. (2 3 4) - Octahedral
4. (2 3 5) - Icosahedral

These are called Möbius triangles.

In addition Schwarz triangles consider (p q r) which are rational numbers. Each of these can be classified in one of the 4 sets above. Octahedral-symmetry triangles that reduce to a subsymmetry are given in italics (and their densities are not necessarily equal to those of the same triangle under said subsymmetry). (This also would occur for prismatic triangles (2 2 n/d) whenever n and d have a common factor.)

Density (μ)	Dihedral	Tetrahedral	Octahedral	Icosahedral
d	(2 2 n/d)			
1		(2 3 3)	(2 3 4)	(2 3 5)
2		(3/2 3 3)	(3/2 4 4), (3 3 4/2)	(3/2 5 5), (5/2 3 3)
3		(2 3/2 3)	(4 2 4/2)	(2 5/2 5)
4			(3 4/3 4), (3 3 3/2)	(3 5/3 5)
5		(2 3/2 3/2)	(2 3/2 4)	
6		(3/2 3/2 3/2)	(4/2 4/2 4/2), (2 2 4/2), (3 4/2 3/2)	(5/2 5/2 5/2), (3/2 3 5), (5/4 5 5)
7			(2 3 4/3)	(2 3 5/2)
8				(3/2 5/2 5)
9			(4/2 2 4/3)	(2 5/3 5)
10			(4/2 3/2 3/2)	(3 5/3 5/2), (3 5/4 5)
11			(2 3/2 4/3)	(2 3/2 5)
12			(3/2 3/2 3/2)	
13				(2 3 5/3)
14			(3/2 4/3 4/3)	(3/2 5/2 5/2), (3 3 5/4)
16				(3 5/4 5/2)
17				(2 3/2 5/2)
18				(3/2 3 5/3), (5/3 5/3 5/2)
19				(2 3 5/4)
21				(2 5/4 5/2)
22				(3/2 3/2 5/2)
23				(2 3/2 5/3)
26				(3/2 5/3 5/3)
27				(2 5/4 5/3)
29				(2 3/2 5/4)
32				(3/2 5/4 5/3)
34				(3/2 3/2 5/4)
38				(3/2 5/4 5/4)
42				(5/4 5/4 5/4)

Although a polyhedron usually has the same density as the Schwarz triangle it is generated from, this is not always the case. Firstly, polyhedra that have faces passing through the centre of the model (including the hemipolyhedra, great dirhombicosidodecahedron, and great disnub dirhombidodecahedron) do not have a well-defined density. Secondly, the even-faced non-orientable uniform polyhedra also do not have a well-defined density. Thirdly, the distortion necessary to recover uniformity when changing a spherical polyhedron to its planar counterpart can push faces through the centre of the polyhedron and back out the other side, changing the density. This happens in the following cases:

- The great truncated cuboctahedron, 2 3 4/3 |. While the Schwarz triangle (2 3 4/3) has density 7, recovering uniformity pushes the eight hexagons through the centre, yielding density |7 − 8| = 1, the same as that of the colunar Schwarz triangle (2 3 4) that shares the same great circles.
- The truncated dodecadodecahedron, 2 5/3 5 |. While the Schwarz triangle (2 5/3 5) has density 9, recovering uniformity pushes the twelve decagons through the centre, yielding density |9 − 12| = 3, the same as that of the colunar Schwarz triangle (2 5/2 5) that shares the same great circles.
- Three snub polyhedra: the great icosahedron | 2 3/2 3/2, the small retrosnub icosicosidodecahedron | 3/2 3/2 5/2, and the great retrosnub icosidodecahedron | 2 3/2 5/3. Here the vertex figures have been distorted into pentagrams or hexagrams rather than pentagons or hexagons, pushing all the snub triangles through the centre and yielding densities of |5 − 12| = 7, |22 − 60| = 38, and |23 − 60| = 37 respectively. These densities are the same as those of colunar reflex-angled Schwarz triangles that are not included above. Thus the great icosahedron may be considered to come from (2/3 3 3) or (2 3 3/4), the small retrosnub icosicosidodecahedron from (3 3 5/8) or (3 3/4 5/3), and the great retrosnub icosidodecahedron from (2/3 3 5/2), (2 3/4 5/3), or (2 3 5/7). (Coxeter, "Uniform polyhedra", 1954)

== Summary table ==
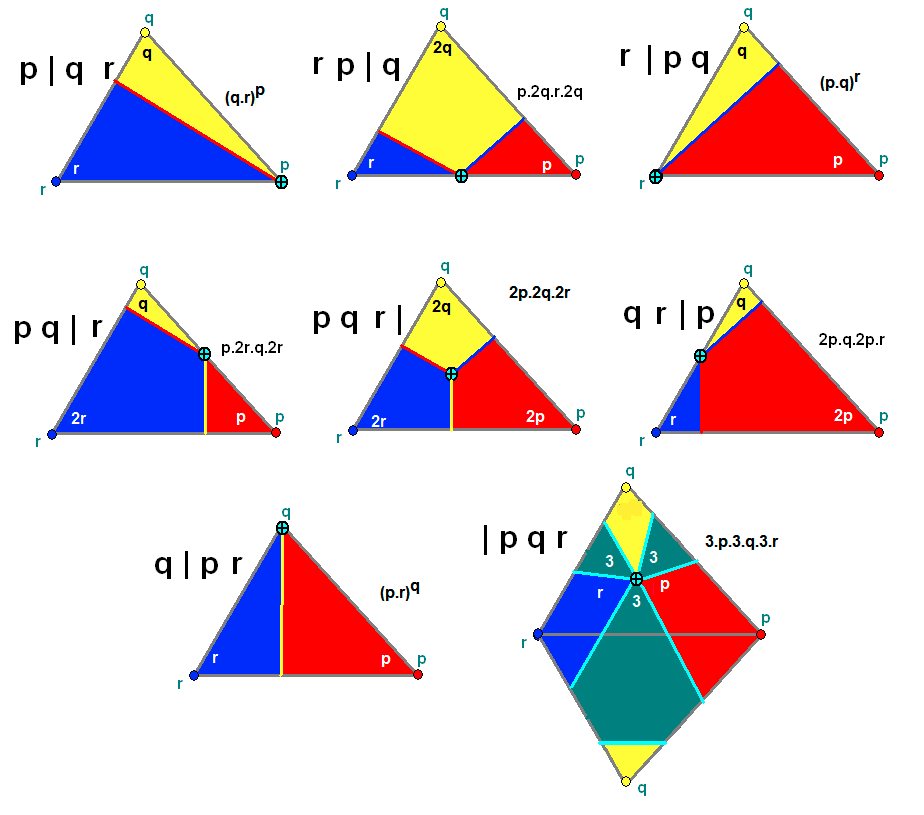
The eight forms for the Wythoff constructions from a general triangle (p q r). Partial snubs can also be created (not shown in this article).

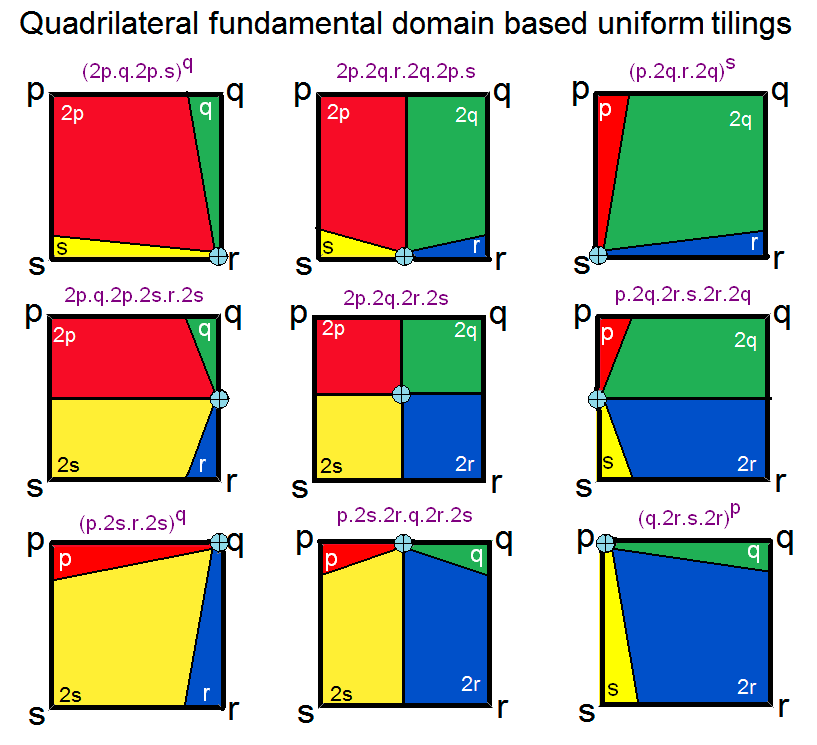
The nine reflexible forms for the Wythoff constructions from a general quadrilateral (p q r s).

There are seven generator points with each set of p,q,r (and a few special forms):

General				Right triangle (r=2)			
Description	Wythoff symbol	Vertex configuration	Coxeter diagram	Wythoff symbol	Vertex configuration	Schläfli symbol	Coxeter diagram
regular and quasiregular	q | p r	(p.r)^{q}		q | p 2	p^{q}	{p,q}	
regular and quasiregular	p | q r	(q.r)^{p}		p | q 2	q^{p}	{q,p}	
regular and quasiregular	r | p q	(q.p)^{r}		2 | p q	(q.p)^{2}	t_{1}{p,q}	
truncated and expanded	q r | p	q.2p.r.2p		q 2 | p	q.2p.2p	t_{0,1}{p,q}	
truncated and expanded	p r | q	p.2q.r.2q		p 2 | q	p. 2q.2q	t_{0,1}{q,p}	
truncated and expanded	p q | r	2r.q.2r.p		p q | 2	4.q.4.p	t_{0,2}{p,q}	
even-faced	p q r |	2r.2q.2p		p q 2 |	4.2q.2p	t_{0,1,2}{p,q}	
even-faced	p q ^{r}_{s} |	2p.2q.-2p.-2q	-	p 2 ^{r}_{s} |	2p.4.-2p.^{4}/_{3}		-
snub	| p q r	3.r.3.q.3.p		| p q 2	3.3.q.3.p	sr{p,q}	
snub	| p q r s	(4.p.4.q.4.r.4.s)/2	-	-	-		-

There are four special cases:

- p q ^{r}_{s} | – This is a mixture of p q r | and p q s |. Both the symbols p q r | and p q s | generate a common base polyhedron with some extra faces. The notation p q ^{r}_{s} | then represents the base polyhedron, made up of the faces common to both p q r | and p q s |.
- | p q r – Snub forms (alternated) are given this otherwise unused symbol.
- | p q r s – A unique snub form for U75 that isn't Wythoff-constructible using triangular fundamental domains. Four numbers are included in this Wythoff symbol as this polyhedron has a tetragonal spherical fundamental domain.
- | (p) q (r) s – A unique snub form for Skilling's figure that isn't Wythoff-constructible.

This conversion table from Wythoff symbol to vertex configuration fails for the exceptional five polyhedra listed above whose densities do not match the densities of their generating Schwarz triangle tessellations. In these cases the vertex figure is highly distorted to achieve uniformity with flat faces: in the first two cases it is an obtuse triangle instead of an acute triangle, and in the last three it is a pentagram or hexagram instead of a pentagon or hexagon, winding around the centre twice. This results in some faces being pushed right through the polyhedron when compared with the topologically equivalent forms without the vertex figure distortion and coming out retrograde on the other side.

In the tables below, red backgrounds mark degenerate polyhedra. Green backgrounds mark the convex uniform polyhedra.

== Dihedral (prismatic) ==
In dihedral Schwarz triangles, two of the numbers are 2, and the third may be any rational number strictly greater than 1.

1. (2 2 n/d) – degenerate if gcd(n, d) > 1.

Many of the polyhedra with dihedral symmetry have digon faces that make them degenerate polyhedra (e.g. dihedra and hosohedra). Columns of the table that only give degenerate uniform polyhedra are not included: special degenerate cases (only in the (2 2 2) Schwarz triangle) are marked with a large cross. Uniform crossed antiprisms with a base {p} where p < 3/2 cannot exist as their vertex figures would violate the triangular inequality; these are also marked with a large cross. The 3/2-crossed antiprism (trirp) is degenerate, being flat in Euclidean space, and is also marked with a large cross. The Schwarz triangles (2 2 n/d) are listed here only when gcd(n, d) = 1, as they otherwise result in only degenerate uniform polyhedra.

The list below gives all possible cases where n ≤ 6.

(p q r)	q r | p q.2p.r.2p	p r | q p. 2q.r.2q	p q r | 2r.2q.2p	| p q r 3.r.3.q.3.p
(2 2 2) (μ=1)	X	X	4.4.4 cube 4-p	3.3.3 tet 2-ap
(2 2 3) (μ=1)	4.3.4 trip 3-p	4.3.4 trip 3-p	6.4.4 hip 6-p	3.3.3.3 oct 3-ap
(2 2 3/2) (μ=2)	4.3.4 trip 3-p	4.3.4 trip 3-p	6/2.4.4; 2trip 6/2-p	X
(2 2 4) (μ=1)	4.4.4 cube 4-p	4.4.4 cube 4-p	8.4.4 op 8-p	3.4.3.3 squap 4-ap
(2 2 4/3) (μ=3)	4.4.4 cube 4-p	4.4.4 cube 4-p	8/3.4.4 stop 8/3-p	X
(2 2 5) (μ=1)	4.5.4 pip 5-p	4.5.4 pip 5-p	10.4.4 dip 10-p	3.5.3.3 pap 5-ap
(2 2 5/2) (μ=2)	4.5/2.4 stip 5/2-p	4.5/2.4 stip 5/2-p	10/2.4.4; 2pip 10/2-p	3.5/2.3.3 stap 5/2-ap
(2 2 5/3) (μ=3)	4.5/2.4 stip 5/2-p	4.5/2.4 stip 5/2-p	10/3.4.4 stiddip 10/3-p	3.5/3.3.3 starp 5/3-ap
(2 2 5/4) (μ=4)	4.5.4 pip 5-p	4.5.4 pip 5-p	10/4.4.4; 2stip 10/4-p	X
(2 2 6) (μ=1)	4.6.4 hip 6-p	4.6.4 hip 6-p	12.4.4 twip 12-p	3.6.3.3 hap 6-ap
(2 2 6/5) (μ=5)	4.6.4 hip 6-p	4.6.4 hip 6-p	12/5.4.4 stwip 12/5-p	X
(2 2 n) (μ=1)	4.n.4 n-p	4.n.4 n-p	2n.4.4 2n-p	3.n.3.3 n-ap
(2 2 n/d) (μ=d)	4.n/d.4 n/d-p	4.n/d.4 n/d-p	2n/d.4.4 2n/d-p	3.n/d.3.3 n/d-ap

== Tetrahedral ==
In tetrahedral Schwarz triangles, the maximum numerator allowed is 3.

#	(p q r)	q | p r (p.r)^{q}	p | q r (q.r)^{p}	r | p q (q.p)^{r}	q r | p q.2p.r.2p	p r | q p. 2q.r.2q	p q | r 2r.q.2r.p	p q r | 2r.2q.2p	| p q r 3.r.3.q.3.p
1	(3 3 2) (μ=1)	3.3.3 tet U1	3.3.3 tet U1	3.3.3.3 oct U5	3.6.6 tut U2	3.6.6 tut U2	4.3.4.3 co U7	4.6.6 toe U8	3.3.3.3.3 ike U22
2	(3 3 3/2) (μ=2)	(3.3.3.3.3.3)/2; 2tet –	(3.3.3.3.3.3)/2; 2tet –	(3.3.3.3.3.3)/2; 2tet –	3.6.3/2.6 oho U3	3.6.3/2.6 oho U3	2(6/2.3.6/2.3); 2oct –	2(6/2.6.6); 2tut –	2(3.3/2.3.3.3.3); 2oct+8{3} –
3	(3 2 3/2) (μ=3)	3.3.3.3 oct U5	3.3.3 tet U1	3.3.3 tet U1	3.6.6 tut U2	2(3/2.4.3.4); 2thah U4*	3(3.6/2.6/2); 3tet –	2(6/2.4.6) cho+4{6/2} U15*	3(3.3.3); 3tet –
4	(2 3/2 3/2) (μ=5)	3.3.3 tet U1	3.3.3.3 oct U5	3.3.3 tet U1	3.4.3.4 co U7	3(6/2.3.6/2); 3tet –	3(6/2.3.6/2); 3tet –	4(6/2.6/2.4); 2oct+6{4} –	(3.3.3.3.3)/2 gike U53
5	(3/2 3/2 3/2) (μ=6)	(3.3.3.3.3.3)/2; 2tet –	(3.3.3.3.3.3)/2; 2tet –	(3.3.3.3.3.3)/2; 2tet –	2(6/2.3.6/2.3); 2oct –	2(6/2.3.6/2.3); 2oct –	2(6/2.3.6/2.3); 2oct –	6(6/2.6/2.6/2); 6tet –	?

== Octahedral ==
In octahedral Schwarz triangles, the maximum numerator allowed is 4. There also exist octahedral Schwarz triangles which use 4/2 as a number, but these only lead to degenerate uniform polyhedra as 4 and 2 have a common factor.

#	(p q r)	q | p r (p.r)^{q}	p | q r (q.r)^{p}	r | p q (q.p)^{r}	q r | p q.2p.r.2p	p r | q p. 2q.r.2q	p q | r 2r.q.2r.p	p q r | 2r.2q.2p	| p q r 3.r.3.q.3.p
1	(4 3 2) (μ=1)	4.4.4 cube U6	3.3.3.3 oct U5	3.4.3.4 co U7	3.8.8 tic U9	4.6.6 toe U8	4.3.4.4 sirco U10	4.6.8 girco U11	3.3.3.3.4 snic U12
2	(4 4 3/2) (μ=2)	(3/2.4)^{4} oct+6{4} –	(3/2.4)^{4} oct+6{4} –	(4.4.4.4.4.4)/2; 2cube –	3/2.8.4.8 socco U13	3/2.8.4.8 socco U13	2(6/2.4.6/2.4); 2co –	2(6/2.8.8); 2tic –	?
3	(4 3 4/3) (μ=4)	(4.4.4.4.4.4)/2; 2cube –	(3/2.4)^{4} oct+6{4} –	(3/2.4)^{4} oct+6{4} –	3/2.8.4.8 socco U13	2(4/3.6.4.6); 2cho U15*	3.8/3.4.8/3 gocco U14	6.8.8/3 cotco U16	?
4	(4 2 3/2) (μ=5)	3.4.3.4 co U7	3.3.3.3 oct U5	4.4.4 cube U6	3.8.8 tic U9	4.4.3/2.4 querco U17	4(4.6/2.6/2); 2oct+6{4} –	2(4.6/2.8) sroh+8{6/2} U18*	?
5	(3 2 4/3) (μ=7)	3.4.3.4 co U7	4.4.4 cube U6	3.3.3.3 oct U5	4.6.6 toe U8	4.4.3/2.4 querco U17	3.8/3.8/3 quith U19	4.6/5.8/3 quitco U20	?
6	(2 3/2 4/3) (μ=11)	4.4.4 cube U6	3.4.3.4 co U7	3.3.3.3 oct U5	4.3.4.4 sirco U10	4(4.6/2.6/2); 2oct+6{4} –	3.8/3.8/3 quith U19	2(4.6/2.8/3) groh+8{6/2} U21*	?
7	(3/2 4/3 4/3) (μ=14)	(3/2.4)^{4} = (3.4)^{4}/3 oct+6{4} –	(4.4.4.4.4.4)/2; 2cube –	(3/2.4)^{4} = (3.4)^{4}/3 oct+6{4} –	2(6/2.4.6/2.4); 2co –	3.8/3.4.8/3 gocco U14	3.8/3.4.8/3 gocco U14	2(6/2.8/3.8/3); 2quith –	?

== Icosahedral ==
In icosahedral Schwarz triangles, the maximum numerator allowed is 5. Additionally, the numerator 4 cannot be used at all in icosahedral Schwarz triangles, although numerators 2 and 3 are allowed. (If 4 and 5 could occur together in some Schwarz triangle, they would have to do so in some Möbius triangle as well; but this is impossible as (2 4 5) is a hyperbolic triangle, not a spherical one.)

#	(p q r)	q | p r (p.r)^{q}	p | q r (q.r)^{p}	r | p q (q.p)^{r}	q r | p q.2p.r.2p	p r | q p. 2q.r.2q	p q | r 2r.q.2r.p	p q r | 2r.2q.2p	| p q r 3.r.3.q.3.p
1	(5 3 2) (μ=1)	5.5.5 doe U23	3.3.3.3.3 ike U22	3.5.3.5 id U24	3.10.10 tid U26	5.6.6 ti U25	4.3.4.5 srid U27	4.6.10 grid U28	3.3.3.3.5 snid U29
2	(3 3 5/2) (μ=2)	3.5/2.3.5/2.3.5/2 sidtid U30	3.5/2.3.5/2.3.5/2 sidtid U30	(3^{10})/2; 2ike –	3.6.5/2.6 siid U31	3.6.5/2.6 siid U31	2(10/2.3.10/2.3); 2id –	2(10/2.6.6); 2ti –	3.5/2.3.3.3.3 seside U32
3	(5 5 3/2) (μ=2)	(5.3/2)^{5} cid –	(5.3/2)^{5} cid –	(5.5.5.5.5.5)/2; 2doe –	5.10.3/2.10 saddid U33	5.10.3/2.10 saddid U33	2(6/2.5.6/2.5); 2id –	2(6/2.10.10); 2tid –	2(3.3/2.3.5.3.5); 2id+40{3} –
4	(5 5/2 2) (μ=3)	(5.5.5.5.5)/2 gad U35	5/2.5/2.5/2.5/2.5/2 sissid U34	5/2.5.5/2.5 did U36	5/2.10.10 tigid U37	5.10/2.10/2; 3doe –	4.5/2.4.5 raded U38	2(4.10/2.10) sird+12{10/2} U39*	3.3.5/2.3.5 siddid U40
5	(5 3 5/3) (μ=4)	5.5/3.5.5/3.5.5/3 ditdid U41	(3.5/3)^{5} gacid –	(3.5)^{5}/3 cid –	3.10.5/3.10 sidditdid U43	5.6.5/3.6 ided U44	10/3.3.10/3.5 gidditdid U42	10/3.6.10 idtid U45	3.5/3.3.3.3.5 sided U46
6	(5/2 5/2 5/2) (μ=6)	(5/2)^{10}/2; 2sissid –	(5/2)^{10}/2; 2sissid –	(5/2)^{10}/2; 2sissid –	2(5/2.10/2)^{2} 2did –	2(5/2.10/2)^{2} 2did –	2(5/2.10/2)^{2} 2did –	6(10/2.10/2.10/2); 6doe –	3(3.5/2.3.5/2.3.5/2); 3sidtid –
7	(5 3 3/2) (μ=6)	(3.5.3.5.3.5)/2 gidtid U47	(3^{10})/4; 2gike –	(3.5.3.5.3.5)/2 gidtid U47	2(3.10.3/2.10); 2seihid U49*	5.6.3/2.6 giid U48	5(6/2.3.6/2.5); 3ike+gad –	2(6.6/2.10) siddy+20{6/2} U50*	5(3.3.3.3.3.5)/2; 5ike+gad –
8	(5 5 5/4) (μ=6)	(5^{10})/4; 2gad –	(5^{10})/4; 2gad –	(5^{10})/4; 2gad –	2(5.10.5/4.10); 2sidhid U51*	2(5.10.5/4.10); 2sidhid U51*	10/4.5.10/4.5; 2did –	2(10/4.10.10); 2tigid –	3(3.5.3.5.3.5); 3cid –
9	(3 5/2 2) (μ=7)	(3.3.3.3.3)/2 gike U53	5/2.5/2.5/2 gissid U52	5/2.3.5/2.3 gid U54	5/2.6.6 tiggy U55	3.10/2.10/2; 2gad+ike –	3(4.5/2.4.3) sicdatrid –	4.10/2.6 ri+12{10/2} U56*	3.3.5/2.3.3 gosid U57
10	(5 5/2 3/2) (μ=8)	(5.3/2)^{5} cid –	(5/3.3)^{5} gacid –	5.5/3.5.5/3.5.5/3 ditdid U41	5/3.10.3.10 sidditdid U43	5(5.10/2.3.10/2) ike+3gad –	3(6/2.5/2.6/2.5) sidtid+gidtid –	4(6/2.10/2.10) id+seihid+sidhid –	? (3|3 5/2) + (3/2|3 5)
11	(5 2 5/3) (μ=9)	5.5/2.5.5/2 did U36	5/2.5/2.5/2.5/2.5/2 sissid U34	(5.5.5.5.5)/2 gad U35	5/2.10.10 tigid U37	3(5.4.5/3.4) cadditradid –	10/3.5.5 quit sissid U58	10/3.4.10/9 quitdid U59	3.5/3.3.3.5 isdid U60
12	(3 5/2 5/3) (μ=10)	(3.5/3)^{5} gacid –	(5/2)^{6}/2; 2gissid –	(5/2.3)^{5}/3 gacid –	2(5/2.6.5/3.6); 2sidhei U62*	3(3.10/2.5/3.10/2) ditdid+gidtid –	10/3.5/2.10/3.3 gaddid U61	10/3.10/2.6 giddy+12{10/2} U63*	3.5/3.3.5/2.3.3 gisdid U64
13	(5 3 5/4) (μ=10)	(5.5.5.5.5.5)/2; 2doe –	(3/2.5)^{5} cid –	(3.5)^{5}/3 cid –	3/2.10.5.10 saddid U33	2(5.6.5/4.6); 2gidhei U65*	3(10/4.3.10/4.5) sidtid+ditdid –	2(10/4.6.10) siddy+12{10/4} U50*	?
14	(5 2 3/2) (μ=11)	5.3.5.3 id U24	3.3.3.3.3 ike U22	5.5.5 doe U23	3.10.10 tid U26	3(5/4.4.3/2.4) gicdatrid –	5(5.6/2.6/2); 2ike+gad –	2(6/2.4.10) sird+20{6/2} U39*	5(3.3.3.5.3)/2; 4ike+gad –
15	(3 2 5/3) (μ=13)	3.5/2.3.5/2 gid U54	5/2.5/2.5/2 gissid U52	(3.3.3.3.3)/2 gike U53	5/2.6.6 tiggy U55	3.4.5/3.4 qrid U67	10/3.10/3.3 quit gissid U66	10/3.4.6 gaquatid U68	3.5/3.3.3.3 gisid U69
16	(5/2 5/2 3/2) (μ=14)	(5/3.3)^{5} gacid –	(5/3.3)^{5} gacid –	(5/2)^{6}/2; 2gissid –	3(5/3.10/2.3.10/2) ditdid+gidtid –	3(5/3.10/2.3.10/2) ditdid+gidtid –	2(6/2.5/2.6/2.5/2); 2gid –	10(6/2.10/2.10/2); 2ike+4gad –	?
17	(3 3 5/4) (μ=14)	(3.5.3.5.3.5)/2 gidtid U47	(3.5.3.5.3.5)/2 gidtid U47	(3)^{10}/4; 2gike –	3/2.6.5.6 giid U48	3/2.6.5.6 giid U48	2(10/4.3.10/4.3); 2gid –	2(10/4.6.6); 2tiggy –	?
18	(3 5/2 5/4) (μ=16)	(3/2.5)^{5} cid –	5/3.5.5/3.5.5/3.5 ditdid U41	(5/2.3)^{5}/3 gacid –	5/3.6.5.6 ided U44	5(3/2.10/2.5.10/2) ike+3gad –	5(10/4.5/2.10/4.3); 3sissid+gike –	4(10/4.10/2.6) did+sidhei+gidhei –	?
19	(5/2 2 3/2) (μ=17)	3.5/2.3.5/2 gid U54	(3.3.3.3.3)/2 gike U53	5/2.5/2.5/2 gissid U52	5(10/2.3.10/2); 2gad+ike –	5/3.4.3.4 qrid U67	5(6/2.6/2.5/2); 2gike+sissid –	6(6/2.4.10/2); 2gidtid+rhom –	?
20	(5/2 5/3 5/3) (μ=18)	(5/2)^{10}/2; 2sissid –	(5/2)^{10}/2; 2sissid –	(5/2)^{10}/2; 2sissid –	2(5/2.10/2)^{2} 2did –	2(5/2.10/3.5/3.10/3); 2gidhid U70*	2(5/2.10/3.5/3.10/3); 2gidhid U70*	2(10/3.10/3.10/2); 2quitsissid –	?
21	(3 5/3 3/2) (μ=18)	(3^{10})/2; 2ike –	5/2.3.5/2.3.5/2.3 sidtid U30	5/2.3.5/2.3.5/2.3 sidtid U30	5/2.6.3.6 siid U31	2(3.10/3.3/2.10/3); 2geihid U71*	5(6/2.5/3.6/2.3) sissid+3gike –	2(6/2.10/3.6) giddy+20{6/2} U63*	?
22	(3 2 5/4) (μ=19)	3.5.3.5 id U24	5.5.5 doe U23	3.3.3.3.3 ike U22	5.6.6 ti U25	3(3/2.4.5/4.4) gicdatrid –	5(10/4.10/4.3); 2sissid+gike –	2(10/4.4.6) ri+12{10/4} U56*	?
23	(5/2 2 5/4) (μ=21)	5/2.5.5/2.5 did U36	(5.5.5.5.5)/2 gad U35	5/2.5/2.5/2.5/2.5/2 sissid U34	3(10/2.5.10/2); 3doe –	3(5/3.4.5.4) cadditradid –	3(10/4.5/2.10/4); 3gissid –	6(10/4.4.10/2); 2ditdid+rhom –	?
24	(5/2 3/2 3/2) (μ=22)	5/2.3.5/2.3.5/2.3 sidtid U30	(3^{10})/2; 2ike –	5/2.3.5/2.3.5/2.3 sidtid U30	2(3.10/2.3.10/2); 2id –	5(5/3.6/2.3.6/2) sissid+3gike –	5(5/3.6/2.3.6/2) sissid+3gike –	10(6/2.6/2.10/2); 4ike+2gad –	(3.3.3.3.3.5/2)/2 sirsid U72
25	(2 5/3 3/2) (μ=23)	(3.3.3.3.3)/2 gike U53	5/2.3.5/2.3 gid U54	5/2.5/2.5/2 gissid U52	3(5/2.4.3.4) sicdatrid –	10/3.3.10/3 quit gissid U66	5(6/2.5/2.6/2); 2gike+sissid –	2(6/2.10/3.4) gird+20{6/2} U73*	(3.3.3.5/2.3)/2 girsid U74
26	(5/3 5/3 3/2) (μ=26)	(5/2.3)^{5}/3 gacid –	(5/2.3)^{5}/3 gacid –	(5/2)^{6}/2; 2gissid –	5/2.10/3.3.10/3 gaddid U61	5/2.10/3.3.10/3 gaddid U61	2(6/2.5/2.6/2.5/2); 2gid –	2(6/2.10/3.10/3); 2quitgissid –	?
27	(2 5/3 5/4) (μ=27)	(5.5.5.5.5)/2 gad U35	5/2.5.5/2.5 did U36	5/2.5/2.5/2.5/2.5/2 sissid U34	5/2.4.5.4 raded U38	10/3.5.10/3 quit sissid U58	3(10/4.5/2.10/4); 3gissid –	2(10/4.10/3.4) gird+12{10/4} U73*	?
28	(2 3/2 5/4) (μ=29)	5.5.5 doe U23	3.5.3.5 id U24	3.3.3.3.3 ike U22	3.4.5.4 srid U27	2(6/2.5.6/2); 2ike+gad –	5(10/4.3.10/4); 2sissid+gike –	6(10/4.6/2.4/3); 2sidtid+rhom –	?
29	(5/3 3/2 5/4) (μ=32)	5/3.5.5/3.5.5/3.5 ditdid U41	(3.5)^{5}/3 cid –	(3.5/2)^{5}/3 gacid –	3.10/3.5.10/3 gidditdid U42	3(5/2.6/2.5.6/2) sidtid+gidtid –	5(10/4.3.10/4.5/2); 3sissid+gike –	4(10/4.6/2.10/3) gid+geihid+gidhid –	?
30	(3/2 3/2 5/4) (μ=34)	(3.5.3.5.3.5)/2 gidtid U47	(3.5.3.5.3.5)/2 gidtid U47	(3)^{10}/4; 2gike –	5(3.6/2.5.6/2); 3ike+gad –	5(3.6/2.5.6/2); 3ike+gad –	2(10/4.3.10/4.3); 2gid –	10(10/4.6/2.6/2); 2sissid+4gike –	?
31	(3/2 5/4 5/4) (μ=38)	(3.5)^{5}/3 cid –	(5.5.5.5.5.5)/2; 2doe –	(3.5)^{5}/3 cid –	2(5.6/2.5.6/2); 2id –	3(3.10/4.5/4.10/4) sidtid+ditdid –	3(3.10/4.5/4.10/4) sidtid+ditdid –	10(10/4.10/4.6/2); 4sissid+2gike –	5(3.3.3.5/4.3.5/4); 4ike+2gad –
32	(5/4 5/4 5/4) (μ=42)	(5)^{10}/4; 2gad –	(5)^{10}/4; 2gad –	(5)^{10}/4; 2gad –	2(5.10/4.5.10/4); 2did –	2(5.10/4.5.10/4); 2did –	2(5.10/4.5.10/4); 2did –	6(10/4.10/4.10/4); 2gissid –	3(3/2.5.3/2.5.3/2.5); 3cid –

== Non-Wythoffian ==
=== Hemi forms ===
Apart from the octahemioctahedron, the hemipolyhedra are generated as double coverings by the Wythoff construction.

3/2.4.3.4 thah U4 hemi(3 3/2 | 2)	4/3.6.4.6 cho U15 hemi(4 4/3 | 3)	5/4.10.5.10 sidhid U51 hemi(5 5/4 | 5)	5/2.6.5/3.6 sidhei U62 hemi(5/2 5/3 | 3)	5/2.10/3.5/3.10/3 gidhid U70 hemi(5/2 5/3 | 5/3)
	3/2.6.3.6 oho U3 hemi(?)	3/2.10.3.10 seihid U49 hemi(3 3/2 | 5)	5.6.5/4.6 gidhei U65 hemi(5 5/4 | 3)	3.10/3.3/2.10/3 geihid U71 hemi(3 3/2 | 5/3)

=== Reduced forms ===
These polyhedra are generated with extra faces by the Wythoff construction.

Wythoff	Polyhedron	Extra faces	Wythoff	Polyhedron	Extra faces	Wythoff	Polyhedron	Extra faces
3 2 3/2 |	4.6.4/3.6 cho U15	4{6/2}	4 2 3/2 |	4.8.4/3.8/7 sroh U18	8{6/2}	2 3/2 4/3 |	4.8/3.4/3.8/5 groh U21	8{6/2}
5 5/2 2 |	4.10.4/3.10/9 sird U39	12{10/2}	5 3 3/2 |	10.6.10/9.6/5 siddy U50	20{6/2}	3 5/2 2 |	6.4.6/5.4/3 ri U56	12{10/2}
5 5/2 3/2 |	3/2.10.3.10 seihid U49	id + sidhid	5 5/2 3/2 |	5/4.10.5.10 sidhid U51	id + seihid	5 3 5/4 |	10.6.10/9.6/5 siddy U50	12{10/4}
3 5/2 5/3 |	6.10/3.6/5.10/7 giddy U63	12{10/2}	5 2 3/2 |	4.10/3.4/3.10/9 sird U39	20{6/2}	3 5/2 5/4 |	5.6.5/4.6 gidhei U65	did + sidhei
3 5/2 5/4 |	5/2.6.5/3.6 sidhei U62	did + gidhei	3 5/3 3/2 |	6.10/3.6/5.10/7 giddy U63	20{6/2}	3 2 5/4 |	6.4.6/5.4/3 ri U56	12{10/4}
2 5/3 3/2 |	4.10/3.4/3.10/7 gird U73	20{6/2}	5/3 3/2 5/4 |	3.10/3.3/2.10/3 geihid U71	gid + gidhid	5/3 3/2 5/4 |	5/2.10/3.5/3.10/3 gidhid U70	gid + geihid
2 5/3 5/4 |	4.10/3.4/3.10/7 gird U73	12{10/4}						

The tetrahemihexahedron (thah, U4) is also a reduced version of the {3/2}-cupola (retrograde triangular cupola, ratricu) by {6/2}. As such it may also be called the crossed triangular cuploid.

Many cases above are derived from degenerate omnitruncated polyhedra p q r |. In these cases, two distinct degenerate cases p q r | and p q s | can be generated from the same p and q; the result has faces {2p}'s, {2q}'s, and coinciding {2r}'s or {2s}'s respectively. These both yield the same nondegenerate uniform polyhedra when the coinciding faces are discarded, which Coxeter symbolised p q ^{r}_{s} |. These cases are listed below:

4.6.4/3.6 cho U15; 2 3 ^{3/2}_{3/2} |	4.8.4/3.8/7 sroh U18; 2 4 ^{3/2}_{4/2} |	4.10.4/3.10/9 sird U39; 2 5 ^{3/2}_{5/2} |	6.10/3.6/5.10/7 giddy U63; 3 5/3 ^{3/2}_{5/2} |
6.4.6/5.4/3 ri U56; 2 3 ^{5/4}_{5/2} |	4.8/3.4/3.8/5 groh U21; 2 4/3 ^{3/2}_{4/2} |	4.10/3.4/3.10/7 gird U73; 2 5/3 ^{3/2}_{5/4} |	10.6.10/9.6/5 siddy U50; 3 5 ^{3/2}_{5/4} |

In the small and great rhombihexahedra, the fraction 4/2 is used despite it not being in lowest terms. While 2 4 2 | and 2 4/3 2 | represent a single octagonal or octagrammic prism respectively, 2 4 4/2 | and 2 4/3 4/2 | represent three such prisms, which share some of their square faces (precisely those doubled up to produce {8/2}'s). These {8/2}'s appear with fourfold and not twofold rotational symmetry, justifying the use of 4/2 instead of 2. (In fact the small and great rhombihexahedra are respectively the exclusive or of three octagonal and three octagrammic prisms.)

=== Other forms ===
These two uniform polyhedra cannot be generated at all by the Wythoff construction. This is the set of uniform polyhedra commonly described as the "non-Wythoffians". Instead of the triangular fundamental domains of the Wythoffian uniform polyhedra, these two polyhedra have tetragonal fundamental domains.

Skilling's figure is not given an index in Maeder's list due to it being an exotic uniform polyhedron, with ridges (edges in the 3D case) completely coincident. This is also true of some of the degenerate polyhedron included in the above list, such as the small complex icosidodecahedron. This interpretation of edges being coincident allows these figures to have two faces per edge: not doubling the edges would give them 4, 6, 8, 10 or 12 faces meeting at an edge, figures that are usually excluded as uniform polyhedra. Skilling's figure has 4 faces meeting at some edges.

(p q r s)	| p q r s (4.p.4.q.4.r.4.s)/2	| (p) q (r) s (p^{3}.4.q.4.r^{3}.4.s.4)/2
(3/2 5/3 3 5/2)	(4.3/2.4.5/3.4.3.4.5/2)/2 gidrid U75	(3/2^{3}.4.5/3.4.3^{3}.4.5/2.4)/2 gidisdrid Skilling

Vertex figure of | 3 5/3 5/2	Great snub dodecicosidodecahedron	Great dirhombicosidodecahedron	Vertex figure of | 3/2 5/3 3 5/2
Great disnub dirhombidodecahedron	Compound of twenty octahedra	Compound of twenty tetrahemihexahedra	Vertex figure of |(3/2) 5/3 (3) 5/2

Both of these special polyhedra may be derived from the great snub dodecicosidodecahedron, | 3 5/3 5/2 (U64). This is a chiral snub polyhedron, but its pentagrams appear in coplanar pairs. Combining one copy of this polyhedron with its enantiomorph, the pentagrams coincide and may be removed. As the edges of this polyhedron's vertex figure include three sides of a square, with the fourth side being contributed by its enantiomorph, we see that the resulting polyhedron is in fact the compound of twenty octahedra. Each of these octahedra contain one pair of parallel faces that stem from a fully symmetric triangle of | 3 5/3 5/2, while the other three come from the original | 3 5/3 5/2's snub triangles. Additionally, each octahedron can be replaced by the tetrahemihexahedron with the same edges and vertices. Taking the fully symmetric triangles in the octahedra, the original coinciding pentagrams in the great snub dodecicosidodecahedra, and the equatorial squares of the tetrahemihexahedra together yields the great dirhombicosidodecahedron (Miller's monster). Taking the snub triangles of the octahedra instead of the fully symmetric triangles (while leaving the other kinds of faces alone) yields the great disnub dirhombidodecahedron (Skilling's figure).

Other degenerate uniform polyhedra listed in the above under special names are:

- (Small) complex icosidodecahedron (cid): combined icosahedron and great dodecahedron sharing all edges and vertices
- Great complex icosidodecahedron (gacid): combined great icosahedron and small stellated dodecahedron sharing all edges and vertices
- Small complex (ditrigonal) icosidodecahedron (sicdatrid): combined small ditrigonal icosidodecahedron and compound of five cubes sharing all edges and vertices
- Complex (ditrigonal) rhombidodecadodecahedron (cadditradid): combined ditrigonal dodecadodecahedron and compound of five cubes sharing all edges and vertices
- Great complex (ditrigonal) rhombicosidodecahedron (gicdatrid): combined great ditrigonal icosidodecahedron and compound of five cubes sharing all edges and vertices

== Euclidean tilings ==
The only plane triangles that tile the plane once over are (3 3 3), (4 2 4), and (3 2 6): they are respectively the equilateral triangle, the 45-45-90 right isosceles triangle, and the 30-60-90 right triangle. It follows that any plane triangle tiling the plane multiple times must be built up from multiple copies of one of these. The only possibility is the 30-30-120 obtuse isosceles triangle (3/2 6 6) = (6 2 3) + (2 6 3) tiling the plane twice over. Each triangle counts twice with opposite orientations, with a branch point at the 120° vertices.

The tiling {∞,2} made from two apeirogons is not accepted, because its faces meet at more than one edge. Here ∞' denotes the retrograde counterpart to ∞.

The degenerate named forms are:

- chatit: compound of 3 hexagonal tilings + triangular tiling
- chata: compound of 3 hexagonal tilings + triangular tiling + double covers of apeirogons along all edge sequences
- cha: compound of 3 hexagonal tilings + double covers of apeirogons along all edge sequences
- cosa: square tiling + double covers of apeirogons along all edge sequences

(p q r)	q | p r (p.r)^{q}	p | q r (q.r)^{p}	r | p q (q.p)^{r}	q r | p q.2p.r.2p	p r | q p.2q.r.2q	p q | r 2r.q.2r.p	p q r | 2r.2q.2p	| p q r 3.r.3.q.3.p
(6 3 2)	6.6.6 hexat	3.3.3.3.3.3 trat	3.6.3.6 that	3.12.12 toxat	6.6.6 hexat	4.3.4.6 srothat	4.6.12 grothat	3.3.3.3.6 snathat
(4 4 2)	4.4.4.4 squat	4.4.4.4 squat	4.4.4.4 squat	4.8.8 tosquat	4.8.8 tosquat	4.4.4.4 squat	4.8.8 tosquat	3.3.4.3.4 snasquat
(3 3 3)	3.3.3.3.3.3 trat	3.3.3.3.3.3 trat	3.3.3.3.3.3 trat	3.6.3.6 that	3.6.3.6 that	3.6.3.6 that	6.6.6 hexat	3.3.3.3.3.3 trat
(∞ 2 2)	—	—	—	—	4.4.∞ azip	4.4.∞ azip	4.4.∞ azip	3.3.3.∞ azap
(3/2 3/2 3)	3.3.3.3.3.3 trat	3.3.3.3.3.3 trat	3.3.3.3.3.3 trat	∞-covered {3}	∞-covered {3}	3.6.3.6 that	[degenerate]	?
(4 4/3 2)	4.4.4.4 squat	4.4.4.4 squat	4.4.4.4 squat	4.8.8 tosquat	4.8/5.8/5 quitsquat	∞-covered {4}	4.8/3.8/7 qrasquit	?
(4/3 4/3 2)	4.4.4.4 squat	4.4.4.4 squat	4.4.4.4 squat	4.8/5.8/5 quitsquat	4.8/5.8/5 quitsquat	4.4.4.4 squat	4.8/5.8/5 quitsquat	3.3.4/3.3.4/3 rasisquat
(3/2 6 2)	3.3.3.3.3.3 trat	6.6.6 hexat	3.6.3.6 that	[degenerate]	3.12.12 toxat	3/2.4.6/5.4 qrothat	[degenerate]	?
(3 6/5 2)	3.3.3.3.3.3 trat	6.6.6 hexat	3.6.3.6 that	6.6.6 hexat	3/2.12/5.12/5 quothat	3/2.4.6/5.4 qrothat	4.6/5.12/5 quitothit	?
(3/2 6/5 2)	3.3.3.3.3.3 trat	6.6.6 hexat	3.6.3.6 that	[degenerate]	3/2.12/5.12/5 quothat	3.4.6.4 srothat	[degenerate]	?
(3/2 6 6)	(3/2.6)^{6} chatit	(6.6.6.6.6.6)/2; 2hexat	(3/2.6)^{6} chatit	[degenerate]	3/2.12.6.12 shothat	3/2.12.6.12 shothat	[degenerate]	?
(3 6 6/5)	(3/2.6)^{6} chatit	(6.6.6.6.6.6)/2; 2hexat	(3/2.6)^{6} chatit	∞-covered {6}	3/2.12.6.12 shothat	3.12/5.6/5.12/5 ghothat	6.12/5.12/11 thotithit	?
(3/2 6/5 6/5)	(3/2.6)^{6} chatit	(6.6.6.6.6.6)/2; 2hexat	(3/2.6)^{6} chatit	[degenerate]	3.12/5.6/5.12/5 ghothat	3.12/5.6/5.12/5 ghothat	[degenerate]	?
(3 3/2 ∞)	(3.∞)^{3}/2 = (3/2.∞)^{3} ditatha	(3.∞)^{3}/2 = (3/2.∞)^{3} ditatha	—	6.3/2.6.∞ chata	[degenerate]	3.∞.3/2.∞ tha	[degenerate]	?
(3 3 ∞')	(3.∞)^{3}/2 = (3/2.∞)^{3} ditatha	(3.∞)^{3}/2 = (3/2.∞)^{3} ditatha	—	6.3/2.6.∞ chata	6.3/2.6.∞ chata	[degenerate]	[degenerate]	?
(3/2 3/2 ∞')	(3.∞)^{3}/2 = (3/2.∞)^{3} ditatha	(3.∞)^{3}/2 = (3/2.∞)^{3} ditatha	—	[degenerate]	[degenerate]	[degenerate]	[degenerate]	?
(4 4/3 ∞)	(4.∞)^{4}/3 cosa	(4.∞)^{4}/3 cosa	—	8.4/3.8.∞ gossa	8/3.4.8/3.∞ sossa	4.∞.4/3.∞ sha	8.8/3.∞ satsa	3.4.3.4/3.3.∞ snassa
(4 4 ∞')	(4.∞)^{4}/3 cosa	(4.∞)^{4}/3 cosa	—	8.4/3.8.∞ gossa	8.4/3.8.∞ gossa	[degenerate]	[degenerate]	?
(4/3 4/3 ∞')	(4.∞)^{4}/3 cosa	(4.∞)^{4}/3 cosa	—	8/3.4.8/3.∞ sossa	8/3.4.8/3.∞ sossa	[degenerate]	[degenerate]	?
(6 6/5 ∞)	(6.∞)^{6}/5 cha	(6.∞)^{6}/5 cha	—	6/5.12.∞.12 ghaha	6.12/5.∞.12/5 shaha	6.∞.6/5.∞ 2hoha	12.12/5.∞ hatha	?
(6 6 ∞')	(6.∞)^{6}/5 cha	(6.∞)^{6}/5 cha	—	6/5.12.∞.12 ghaha	6/5.12.∞.12 ghaha	[degenerate]	[degenerate]	?
(6/5 6/5 ∞')	(6.∞)^{6}/5 cha	(6.∞)^{6}/5 cha	—	6.12/5.∞.12/5 shaha	6.12/5.∞.12/5 shaha	[degenerate]	[degenerate]	?

The tiling 6 6/5 | ∞ is generated as a double cover by Wythoff's construction:

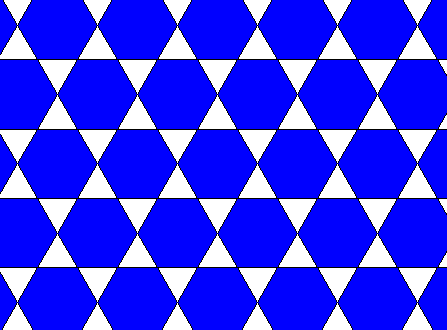
6.∞.6/5.∞
hoha
hemi(6 6/5 | ∞)

Also there are a few tilings with the mixed symbol p q ^{r}_{s} |:

4.12.4/3.12/11 sraht 2 6 ^{3/2}_{6/2} |	4.12/5.4/3.12/7 graht 2 6/5 ^{3/2}_{6/2} |	8/3.8.8/5.8/7 sost 4/3 4 ^{4/2}_{∞/2} |	12/5.12.12/7.12/11 huht 6/5 6 ^{6/2}_{∞/2} |

There are also some non-Wythoffian tilings:

3.3.3.4.4 etrat	3.3.3.4/3.4/3 retrat

The set of uniform tilings of the plane is not proved to be complete, unlike the set of uniform polyhedra. The tilings above represent all found by Coxeter, Longuet-Higgins, and Miller in their 1954 paper on uniform polyhedra. They conjectured that the lists were complete: this was proven by Sopov in 1970 for the uniform polyhedra, but turned out to be false for the uniform tilings. Branko Grünbaum, J. C. P. Miller, and G. C. Shephard list fifteen more non-Wythoffian uniform tilings in Uniform Tilings with Hollow Tiles (1981). (In two cases the same vertex figure results in two distinct tilings.)

4.8.8/3.4/3.∞ rorisassa	4.8/3.8.4/3.∞ rosassa	4.8.4/3.8.4/3.∞ rarsisresa rarsishra	4.8/3.4.8/3.4/3.∞ rassersa rasishra		
3/2.∞.3/2.∞.3/2.4.4 rasrat	3/2.∞.3/2.∞.3/2.4/3.4/3 sarat				
3/2.∞.3/2.∞.3/2.12/5.6.12/5 sarshaha	3/2.∞.3/2.∞.3/2.12/7.6/5.12/7 sishaha	3/2.∞.3/2.∞.3/2.12.6/5.12 garshaha	3/2.∞.3/2.∞.3/2.12/11.6/5.12/11 gishaha	3/2.∞.3/2.4/3.4/3.3/2.4/3.4/3 rodsat	3/2.∞.3/2.4.4.3/2.4.4 roridsat
3/2.∞.3/2.4.4.3/2.4/3.4/3 irdsat

There are two tilings each for the vertex figures 4.8.4/3.8.4/3.∞ and 4.8/3.4.8/3.4/3.∞; they use the same sets of vertices and edges, but have a different set of squares. There exists also a third tiling for each of these two vertex figure that is only pseudo-uniform (all vertices look alike, but they come in two symmetry orbits). Hence, for Euclidean tilings, the vertex configuration does not uniquely determine the tiling. In the pictures below, the included squares with horizontal and vertical edges are marked with a central dot. A single square has edges highlighted.

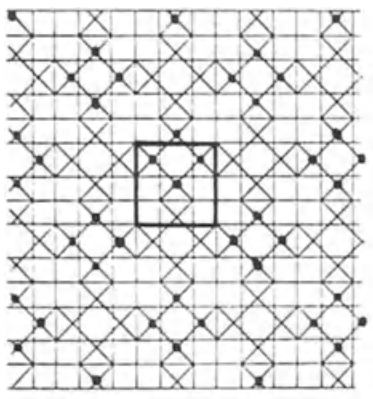
Uniform (wallpaper group p4m)

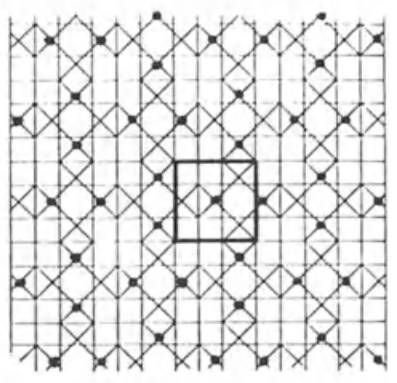
Uniform (wallpaper group p4g)

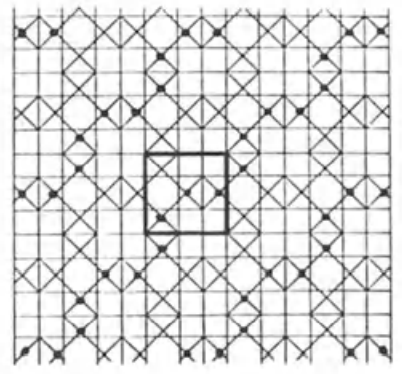
Pseudo-uniform

Grünbaum, Miller, and Shephard also list 33 uniform tilings using zigzags (skew apeirogons) as faces, ten of which are families that have a free parameter (the angle of the zigzag). In eight cases this parameter is continuous; in two, it is discrete.

It is not known if the expanded list given by Grünbaum, Miller, and Shephard is complete.

== Hyperbolic tilings ==
The set of triangles tiling the hyperbolic plane is infinite. Moreover, in hyperbolic space the fundamental domain does not have to be a simplex. Consequently a full listing of the uniform tilings of the hyperbolic plane cannot be given.

Even when restricted to convex tiles, it is possible to find multiple tilings with the same vertex configuration: see for example Snub order-6 square tiling#Related polyhedra and tiling.

A few small convex cases (not involving ideal faces or vertices) have been given below:

(p q r)	q | p r (p.r)^{q}	p | q r (q.r)^{p}	r | p q (q.p)^{r}	q r | p q.2p.r.2p	p r | q p.2q.r.2q	p q | r 2r.p.2r.q	p q r | 2p.2q.2r	| p q r 3.p.3.q.3.r
(7 3 2)	7.7.7 heat	3.3.3.3.3.3.3 hetrat	3.7.3.7 thet	3.14.14 theat	6.6.7 thetrat	4.3.4.7 srothet	4.6.14 grothet	3.3.3.3.7 snathet
(8 3 2)	8.8.8 ocat	3.3.3.3.3.3.3.3 otrat	3.8.3.8 toct	3.16.16 tocat	6.6.8 totrat	4.3.4.8 srotoct	4.6.16 grotoct	3.3.3.3.8 snatoct
(5 4 2)	5.5.5.5 peat	4.4.4.4.4 pesquat	4.5.4.5 tepet	4.10.10 topeat	5.8.8 topesquat	4.4.4.5 srotepet	4.8.10 grotepet	3.3.4.3.5 stepet
(6 4 2)	6.6.6.6 shexat	4.4.4.4.4.4 hisquat	4.6.4.6 tehat	4.12.12 toshexat	6.8.8 thisquat	4.4.4.6 srotehat	4.8.12 grotehat	3.3.4.3.6 snatehat
(5 5 2)	5.5.5.5.5 pepat	5.5.5.5.5 pepat	5.5.5.5 peat	5.10.10 topepat	5.10.10 topepat	4.5.4.5 tepet	4.10.10 topeat	3.3.5.3.5 spepat
(6 6 2)	6.6.6.6.6.6 hihat	6.6.6.6.6.6 hihat	6.6.6.6 shexat	6.12.12 thihat	6.12.12 thihat	4.6.4.6 tehat	4.12.12 toshexat	3.3.6.3.6 shihat
(4 3 3)	3.4.3.4.3.4 ditetsquat	3.3.3.3.3.3.3.3 otrat	3.4.3.4.3.4 ditetsquat	3.8.3.8 toct	6.3.6.4 sittitetrat	6.3.6.4 sittitetrat	6.6.8 totrat	3.3.3.3.3.4 stititet
(4 4 3)	3.4.3.4.3.4.3.4 ditetetrat	3.4.3.4.3.4.3.4 ditetetrat	4.4.4.4.4.4 hisquat	4.8.3.8 sittiteteat	4.8.3.8 sittiteteat	6.4.6.4 tehat	6.8.8 thisquat	3.3.3.4.3.4 stitetet
(4 4 4)	4.4.4.4.4.4.4.4 osquat	4.4.4.4.4.4.4.4 osquat	4.4.4.4.4.4 osquat	4.8.4.8 teoct	4.8.4.8 teoct	4.8.4.8 teoct	8.8.8 ocat	3.4.3.4.3.4 ditetsquat
