= W88 (disambiguation) =

The W88 is a United States thermonuclear warhead.

W88 or W-88 may also refer to:

- Great icosicosidodecahedron, a 52-faced polyhedron
- Stapac Jakarta, an Indonesian basketball club
- Air Harbor Airport in Greensboro, North Carolina
