= Great hexagonal hexecontahedron =

Polyhedron with 60 faces

Great hexagonal hexecontahedron
Type	Star polyhedron
Face	
Elements	F = 60, E = 180; V = 104 (χ = −16)
Symmetry group	I, [5,3]^{+}, 532
Index references	DU_{64}
dual polyhedron	Great snub dodecicosidodecahedron

3D model of a great hexagonal hexecontahedron

In geometry, the great hexagonal hexecontahedron (or great astroid ditriacontahedron) is a nonconvex isohedral polyhedron. It is the dual of the uniform great snub dodecicosidodecahedron. It is partially degenerate, having coincident vertices, as its dual has coplanar pentagrammic faces.

== Proportions ==
The faces are nonconvex hexagons. Denoting the golden ratio by $\phi$, the hexagons have one angle of $\arccos(-\phi^{-1})\approx 128.172\,707\,627\,01^{\circ}$, one of $360^{\circ}-\arccos(-\phi^{-1})\approx 231.827\,292\,372\,99^{\circ}$, and four angles of $90^{\circ}$. They have two long edges, two of medium length and two short ones. If the long edges have length $2$, the medium ones have length $1+\phi^{-3/2}\approx 1.485\,868\,271\,76$ and the short ones $1-\phi^{-3/2}\approx 0.514\,131\,728\,24$. The dihedral angle equals $90^{\circ}$.
