= Great ditrigonal dodecacronic hexecontahedron =

Polyhedron with 60 faces

Great ditrigonal dodecacronic hexecontahedron
Type	Star polyhedron
Face	
Elements	F = 60, E = 120; V = 44 (χ = −16)
Symmetry group	I_{h}, [5,3], *532
Index references	DU_{42}
dual polyhedron	Great ditrigonal dodecicosidodecahedron

3D model of a great ditrigonal dodecacronic hexecontahedron

In geometry, the great ditrigonal dodecacronic hexecontahedron (or great lanceal trisicosahedron) is a nonconvex isohedral polyhedron. It is the dual of the uniform great ditrigonal dodecicosidodecahedron. Its faces are kites. Part of each kite lies inside the solid, hence is invisible in solid models.

== Proportions ==
Kite faces have two angles of $\arccos(\frac{5}{12}-\frac{1}{4}\sqrt{5})\approx 98.183\,872\,491\,81^{\circ}$, one of $\arccos(-\frac{5}{12}+\frac{1}{60}\sqrt{5})\approx 112.296\,452\,073\,54^{\circ}$ and one of $\arccos(-\frac{1}{12}+\frac{19}{60}\sqrt{5})\approx 51.335\,802\,942\,83^{\circ}$. Its dihedral angles equal $\arccos({\frac{-44+3\sqrt{5}}{61}})\approx 127.686\,523\,427\,48^{\circ}$. The ratio between the lengths of the long edges and the short ones equals $\frac{31+5\sqrt{5}}{22}\approx 1.917\,288\,176\,70$.
