= Medial pentagonal hexecontahedron =

Star polyhedron with 60 faces

Medial pentagonal hexecontahedron
Type	Star polyhedron
Face	
Elements	F = 60, E = 150; V = 84 (χ = −6)
Symmetry group	I, [5,3]^{+}, 532
Index references	DU_{40}
dual polyhedron	Snub dodecadodecahedron

In geometry, the medial pentagonal hexecontahedron is a nonconvex isohedral polyhedron. It is the dual of the snub dodecadodecahedron. It has 60 intersecting irregular pentagonal faces.

== Proportions ==
Denote the golden ratio by φ, and let $\xi\approx -0.409\,037\,788\,014\,42$ be the smallest (most negative) real zero of the polynomial $P=8x^4-12x^3+5x+1.$ Then each face has three equal angles of $\arccos(\xi)\approx 114.144\,404\,470\,43^{\circ},$ one of $\arccos(\varphi^2\xi+\varphi)\approx 56.827\,663\,280\,94^{\circ}$ and one of $\arccos(\varphi^{-2}\xi-\varphi^{-1})\approx 140.739\,123\,307\,76^{\circ}.$ Each face has one medium length edge, two short and two long ones. If the medium length is 2, then the short edges have length $1 + \sqrt{\frac{1-\xi}{\varphi^3-\xi}} \approx 1.550\,761\,427\,20,$ and the long edges have length $1 + \sqrt{ \frac{1-\xi}{-\varphi^{-3}-\xi}}\approx 3.854\,145\,870\,08.$ The dihedral angle equals $\arccos\left(\tfrac{\xi}{\xi+1}\right) \approx 133.800\,984\,233\,53^{\circ}.$ The other real zero of the polynomial P plays a similar role for the medial inverted pentagonal hexecontahedron.
