= Great dodecicosacron =

Polyhedron with 60 faces

Great dodecicosacron
Type	Star polyhedron
Face	
Elements	F = 60, E = 120; V = 32 (χ = −28)
Symmetry group	I_{h}, [5,3], *532
Index references	DU_{63}
dual polyhedron	Great dodecicosahedron

3D model of a great dodecicosacron

In geometry, the great dodecicosacron (or great dipteral trisicosahedron) is the dual of the great dodecicosahedron (U_{63}). It has 60 intersecting bow-tie-shaped faces.

== Proportions ==
Each face has two angles of $\arccos(\frac{3}{4}+\frac{1}{20}\sqrt{5})\approx 30.480\,324\,565\,36^{\circ}$ and two angles of $\arccos(-\frac{5}{12}+\frac{1}{4}\sqrt{5})\approx 81.816\,127\,508\,183^{\circ}$. The diagonals of each antiparallelogram intersect at an angle of $\arccos(\frac{5}{12}-\frac{1}{60}\sqrt{5})\approx 67.703\,547\,926\,46^{\circ}$. The dihedral angle equals $\arccos(\frac{-44+3\sqrt{5}}{61})\approx 127.686\,523\,427\,48^{\circ}$. The ratio between the lengths of the long edges and the short ones equals $\frac{1}{2}+\frac{1}{2}\sqrt{5}$, which is the golden ratio. Part of each face lies inside the solid, hence is invisible in solid models.
