= Great icosacronic hexecontahedron =

Polyhedron with 60 faces

Great icosacronic hexecontahedron
Type	Star polyhedron
Face	
Elements	F = 60, E = 120; V = 52 (χ = −8)
Symmetry group	I_{h}, [5,3], *532
Index references	DU_{48}
dual polyhedron	Great icosicosidodecahedron

3D model of a great icosacronic hexecontahedron

In geometry, the great icosacronic hexecontahedron (or great sagittal trisicosahedron) is the dual of the great icosicosidodecahedron. Its faces are darts. A part of each dart lies inside the solid, hence is invisible in solid models.

== Proportions ==
Faces have two angles of $\arccos(\frac{3}{4}+\frac{1}{20}\sqrt{5})\approx 30.480\,324\,565\,36^{\circ}$, one of $\arccos(-\frac{1}{12}+\frac{19}{60}\sqrt{5})\approx 51.335\,802\,942\,83^{\circ}$ and one of $360^{\circ}-\arccos(-\frac{5}{12}+\frac{1}{60}\sqrt{5})\approx 247.703\,547\,926\,46^{\circ}$. Its dihedral angles equal $\arccos({\frac{-44+3\sqrt{5}}{61}})\approx 127.686\,523\,427\,48^{\circ}$. The ratio between the lengths of the long and short edges is $\frac{31+5\sqrt{5}}{22}\approx 1.917\,288\,176\,70$.
