= Uniform star polyhedron =

Self-intersecting uniform polyhedron

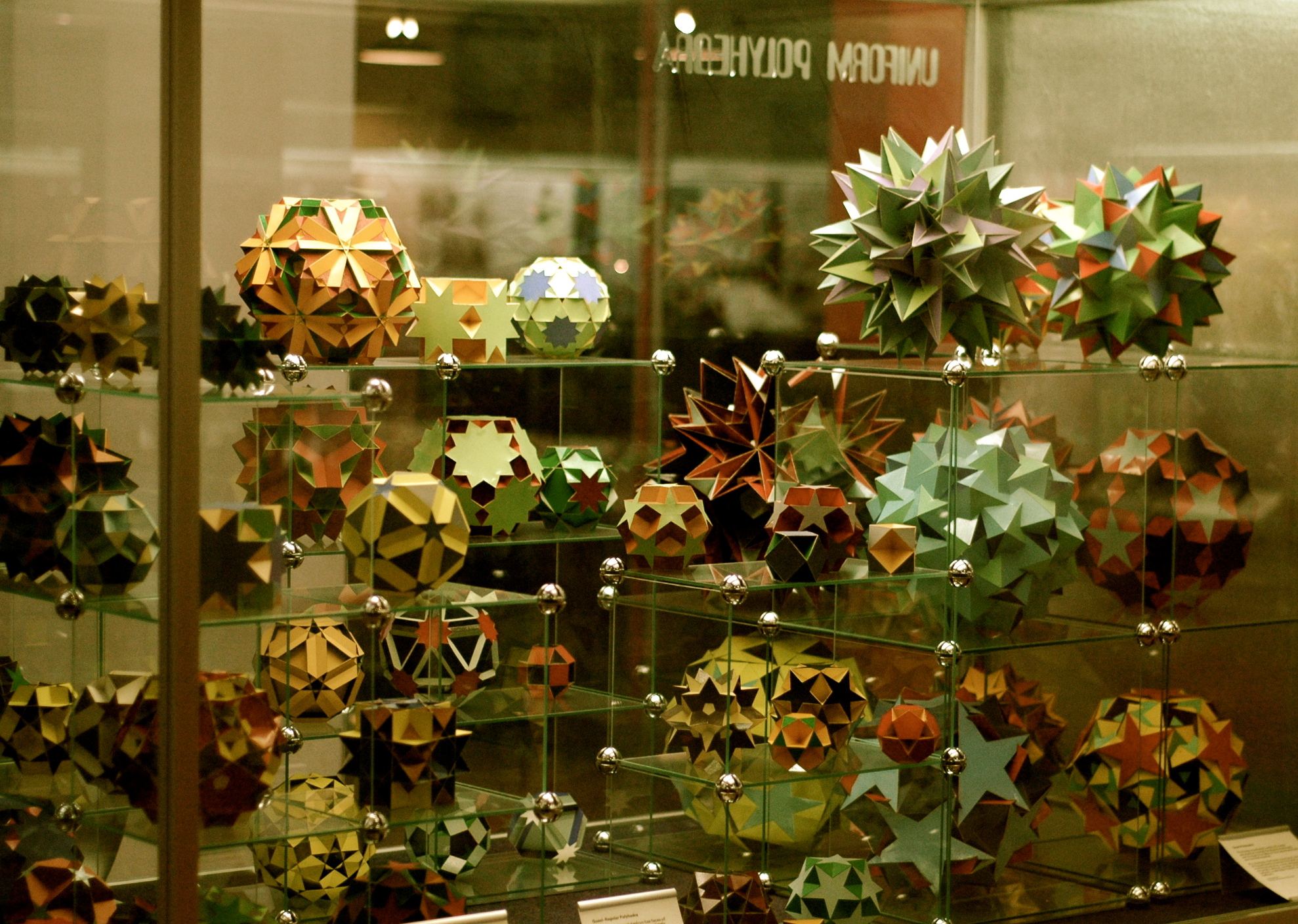
A display of uniform polyhedra at the Science Museum in London

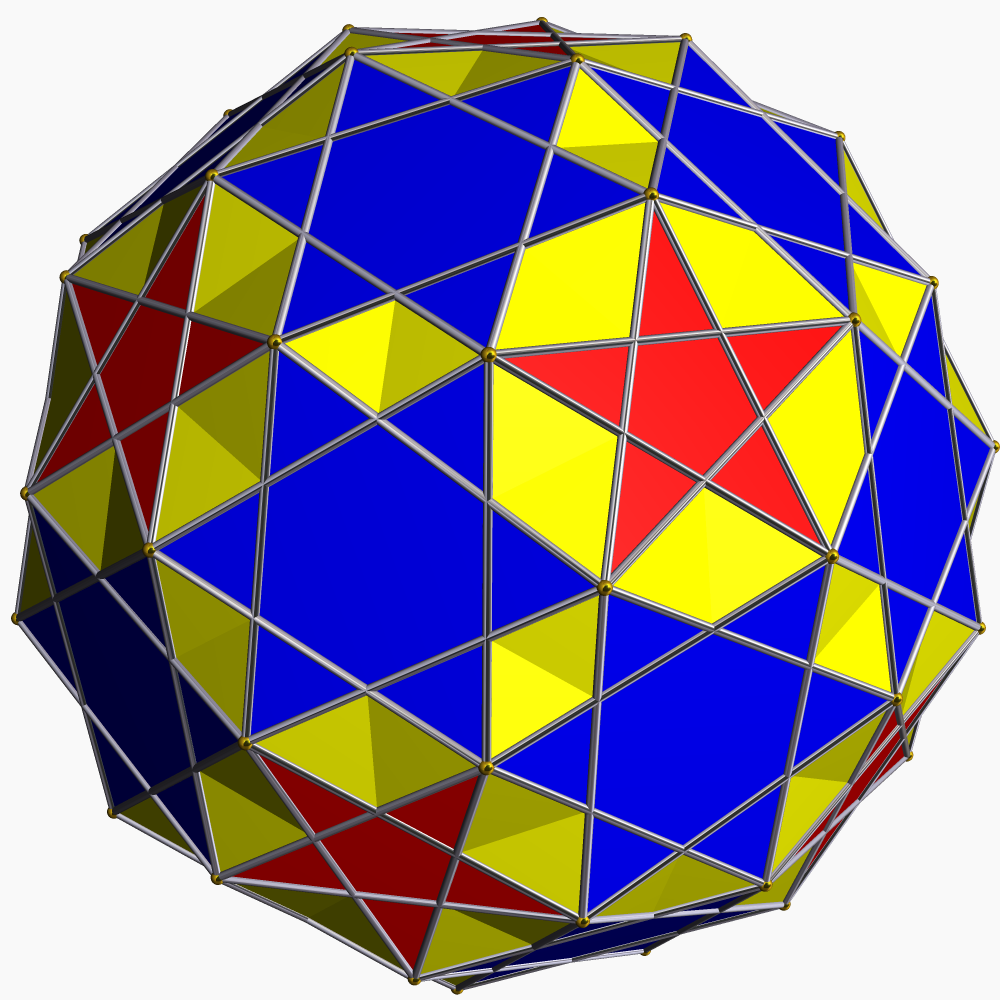
The small snub icosicosidodecahedron is a uniform star polyhedron, with vertex figure 3_{5}.5/2

In geometry, a uniform star polyhedron is a self-intersecting uniform polyhedron. They are also sometimes called nonconvex polyhedra to imply self-intersecting. Each polyhedron can contain either star polygon faces, star polygon vertex figures, or both.

The complete set of 57 nonprismatic uniform star polyhedra includes the 4 regular ones, called the Kepler–Poinsot polyhedra, 14 quasiregular ones, and 39 semiregular ones.

There are also two infinite sets of uniform star prisms and uniform star antiprisms.

Just as (nondegenerate) star polygons (which have polygon density greater than 1) correspond to circular polygons with overlapping tiles, star polyhedra that do not pass through the center have polytope density greater than 1, and correspond to spherical polyhedra with overlapping tiles; there are 47 nonprismatic such uniform star polyhedra. The remaining 10 nonprismatic uniform star polyhedra, those that pass through the center, are the hemipolyhedra as well as Miller's monster, and do not have well-defined densities.

The nonconvex forms are constructed from Schwarz triangles.

All the uniform polyhedra are listed below by their symmetry groups and subgrouped by their vertex arrangements.

Regular polyhedra are labeled by their Schläfli symbol. Other nonregular uniform polyhedra are listed with their vertex configuration.

An additional figure, the pseudo great rhombicuboctahedron, is usually not included as a truly uniform star polytope, despite consisting of regular faces and having the same vertices.

Note: For nonconvex forms below an additional descriptor nonuniform is used when the convex hull vertex arrangement has same topology as one of these, but has nonregular faces. For example an nonuniform cantellated form may have rectangles created in place of the edges rather than squares.

== Dihedral symmetry ==
See Prismatic uniform polyhedron.

== Tetrahedral symmetry ==
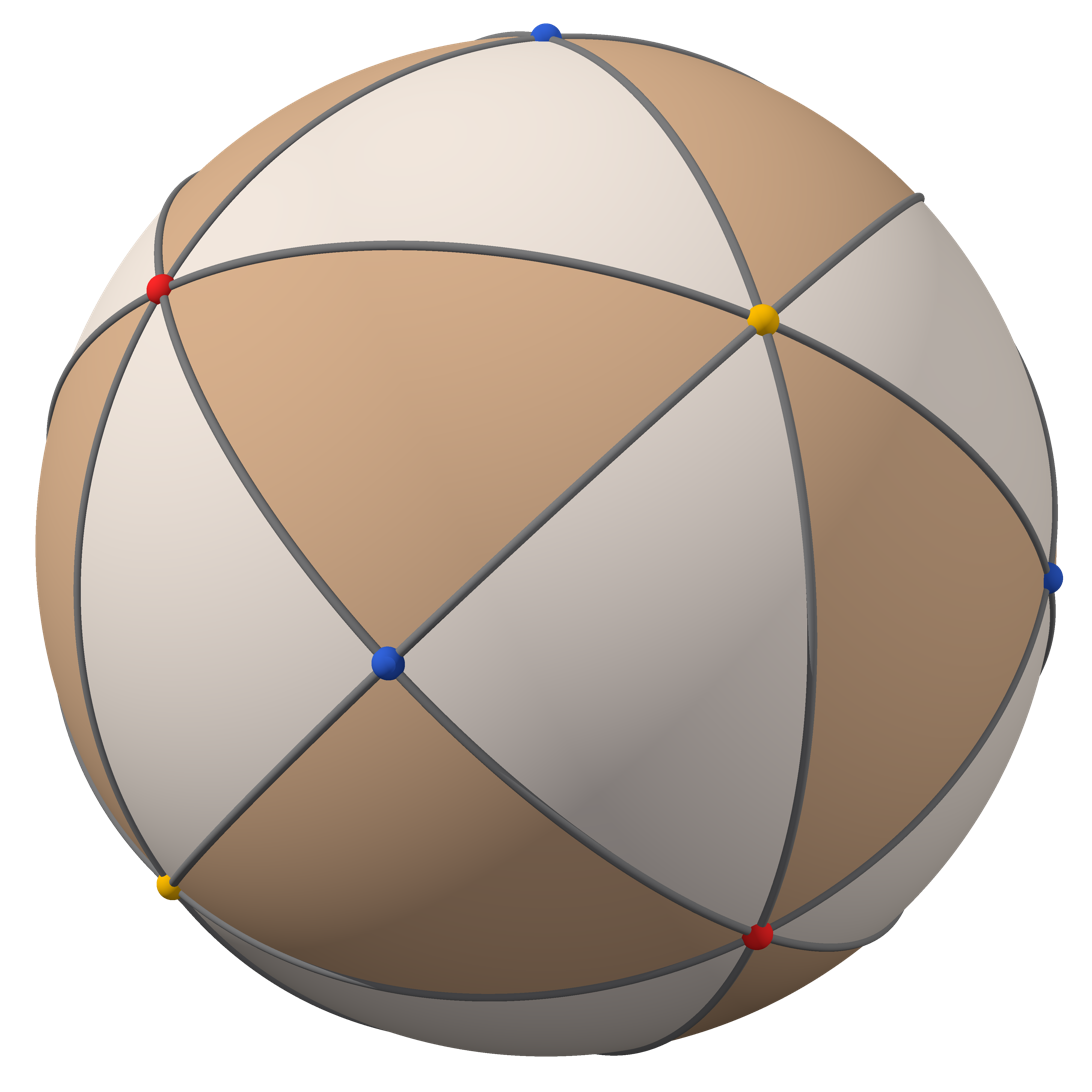
(3 3 2) triangles on sphere

There is one nonconvex form, the tetrahemihexahedron which has tetrahedral symmetry (with fundamental domain Möbius triangle (3 3 2)).

There are two Schwarz triangles that generate unique nonconvex uniform polyhedra: one right triangle (3/2 3 2), and one general triangle (3/2 3 3). The general triangle (3/2 3 3) generates the octahemioctahedron which is given further on with its full octahedral symmetry.

Vertex arrangement (Convex hull)	Nonconvex forms
Tetrahedron	
Rectified tetrahedron Octahedron	4.3/2.4.3; 3/2 3 | 2
Truncated tetrahedron	
Cantellated tetrahedron (Cuboctahedron)	
Omnitruncated tetrahedron (Truncated octahedron)	
Snub tetrahedron (Icosahedron)	

== Octahedral symmetry ==
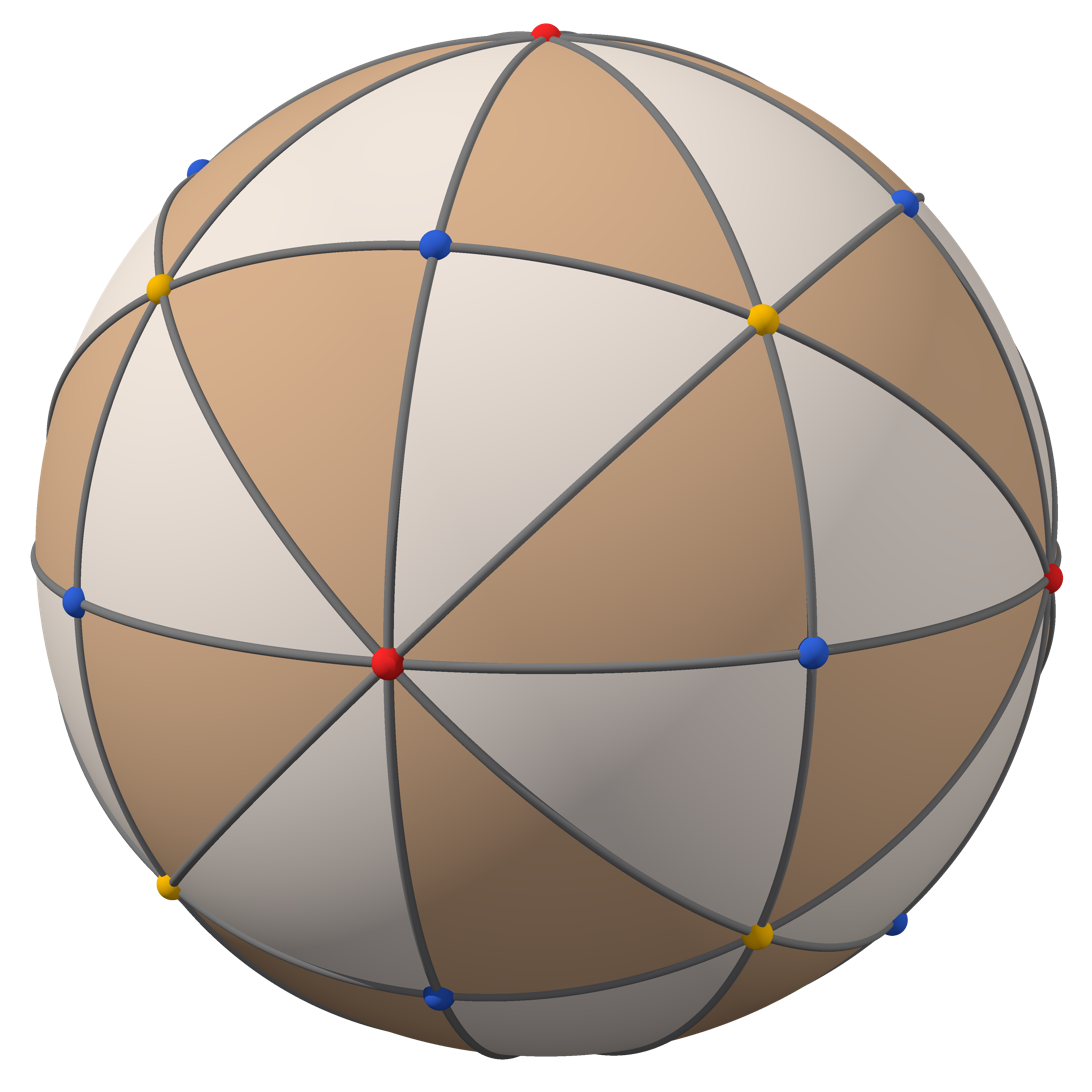
(4 3 2) triangles on sphere

There are 8 convex forms, and 10 nonconvex forms with octahedral symmetry (with fundamental domain Möbius triangle (4 3 2)).

There are four Schwarz triangles that generate nonconvex forms, two right triangles (3/2 4 2), and (4/3 3 2), and two general triangles: (4/3 4 3), (3/2 4 4).

Vertex arrangement (Convex hull)	Nonconvex forms		
Cube			
Octahedron			
Cuboctahedron	6.4/3.6.4; 4/3 4 | 3	6.3/2.6.3; 3/2 3 | 3	
Truncated cube	4.8/3.4/3.8/5; 2 4/3 (3/2 4/2) |	8/3.3.8/3.4; 3 4 | 4/3	4.3/2.4.4; 3/2 4 | 2
Truncated octahedron			
Rhombicuboctahedron	4.8.4/3.8/7; 2 4 (3/2 4/2) |	8.3/2.8.4; 3/2 4 | 4	8/3.8/3.3; 2 3 | 4/3
Nonuniform truncated cuboctahedron	4.6.8/3; 2 3 4/3 |		
Nonuniform truncated cuboctahedron	8/3.6.8; 3 4 4/3 |		
Snub cube			

== Icosahedral symmetry ==
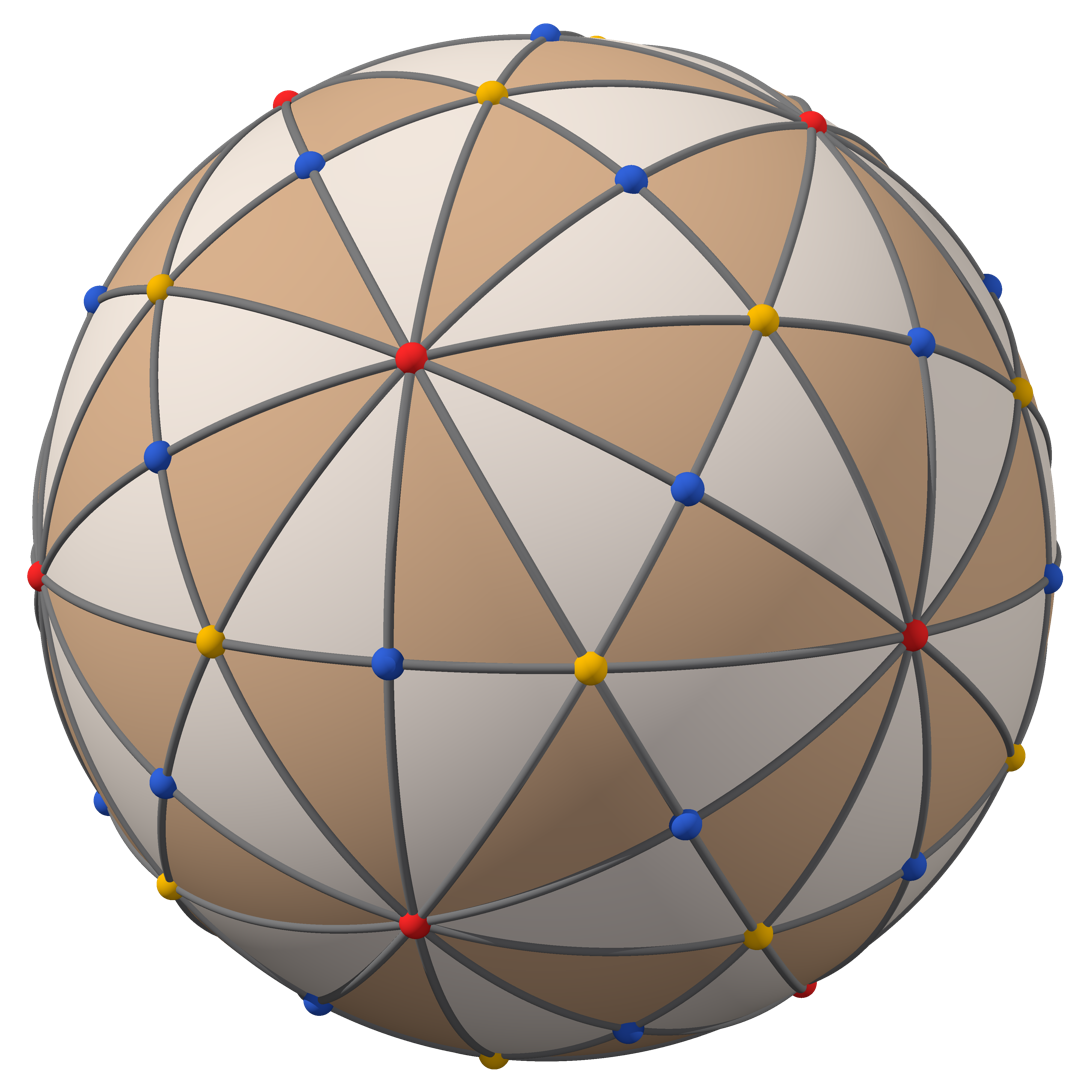
(5 3 2) triangles on sphere

There are 8 convex forms and 46 nonconvex forms with icosahedral symmetry (with fundamental domain Möbius triangle (5 3 2)). (or 47 nonconvex forms if Skilling's figure is included). Some of the nonconvex snub forms have reflective vertex symmetry.

Vertex arrangement (Convex hull)	Nonconvex forms							
Icosahedron	{5,5/2}	{5/2,5}	{3,5/2}					
Nonuniform truncated icosahedron	10.10.5/2; 2 5/2 | 5	3.10/3.5/2.10/7; 5/2 3 | 5/3	3.4.5/3.4; 5/3 3 | 2	4.10/3.4/3.10/7; 2 5/3 (3/2 5/4) |				
Nonuniform truncated icosahedron	4.5/2.4.5; 5/2 5 | 2	5.6.5/3.6; 5/3 5 | 3	4.6.4/3.6/5; 2 3 (5/4 5/2) |					
Nonuniform truncated icosahedron	3^{5}.5/2 | 5/2 3 3							
Icosidodecahedron	3.10.3/2.10; 3/2 3 | 5	5.10.5/4.10; 5/4 5 | 5	3.5/2.3.5/2; 2 | 3 5/2	5/2.10/3.5/3.10/3; 5/3 5/2 | 5/3	3.10/3.3/2.10/3; 3 3 | 5/3	5.5/2.5.5/2; 2 | 5 5/2	6.5/2.6.5/3; 5/3 5/2 | 3	5.6.5/4.6; 5/4 5 | 3
truncated dodecahedron	3.10/3.5.10/3; 3 5 | 5/3	5.6.3/2.6; 3/2 5 | 3	6.10/3.6/5.10/7; 3 5/3 (3/2 5/2) |					
Nonuniform truncated dodecahedron	(3^{5}.5/3)/2 | 3/2 3/2 5/2							
Dodecahedron	{5/2,3}	(3.5/2)^{3} 3 | 5/2 3	(5.5/3)^{3} 3 | 5/3 5	((3.5)^{3})/2 3/2 | 3 5				
Rhombicosidodecahedron	5.10.3/2.10; 3/2 5 | 5	4.10.4/3.10/9; 2 5 (3/2 5/2) |	5.10/3.10/3; 2 5 | 5/3					
Nonuniform rhombicosidodecahedron	6.6.5/2; 2 5/2 | 3							
Nonuniform rhombicosidodecahedron	6.5/2.6.3; 5/2 3 | 3	3.10.5/3.10; 5/3 3 | 5	6.10.6/5.10/9; 3 5 (3/2 5/4) |	3.10/3.10/3; 2 3 | 5/3				
Nonuniform rhombicosidodecahedron	4.5/3.4.3.4.5/2.4.3/2 | 3/2 5/3 3 5/2	3.3.3.5/2.3.5/3 | 5/3 5/2 3	5/2.4.3.3.3.4.5/3.4.3.3/2.3/2.4/2 | 3/2.5/3.3.5/2					
Nonuniform truncated icosidodecahedron	6.10.10/3; 3 5 5/3 |							
Nonuniform truncated icosidodecahedron	4.10/9.10/3; 2 5 5/3 |							
Nonuniform truncated icosidodecahedron	4.6.10/3; 2 3 5/3 |							
Various Nonuniform snub dodecahedra	3.3.5/2.3.5 | 2 5/2 5	3.3.3.5.3.5/3 | 5/3 3 5	3^{4}.5/2 | 2 5/2 3	3^{4}.5/3 | 5/3 2 3	3.3.5.3.5/3 | 5/3 2 5	(3^{4}.5/2)/2 | 3/2 5/3 2		

== Degenerate cases ==
Coxeter identified a number of degenerate star polyhedra by the Wythoff construction method, which contain overlapping edges or vertices. These degenerate forms include:

- Small complex icosidodecahedron (looks like an icosahedron and a great dodecahedron sharing edges and vertices)
- Great complex icosidodecahedron (looks like a great icosahedron and a small stellated dodecahedron sharing edges and vertices)
- Small complex rhombicosidodecahedron (looks like a small ditrigonal icosidodecahedron and a compound of five cubes sharing edges and vertices)
- Great complex rhombicosidodecahedron (looks like a great ditrigonal icosidodecahedron and a compound of five cubes sharing edges and vertices)
- Complex rhombidodecadodecahedron (looks like a ditrigonal dodecadodecahedron and a compound of five cubes sharing edges and vertices)

=== Skilling's figure ===
One further nonconvex degenerate polyhedron is the great disnub dirhombidodecahedron, also known as Skilling's figure, which is vertex-uniform, but has pairs of edges which coincide in space such that four faces meet at some edges. It is counted as a degenerate uniform polyhedron rather than a uniform polyhedron because of its double edges. It has I_{h} symmetry.

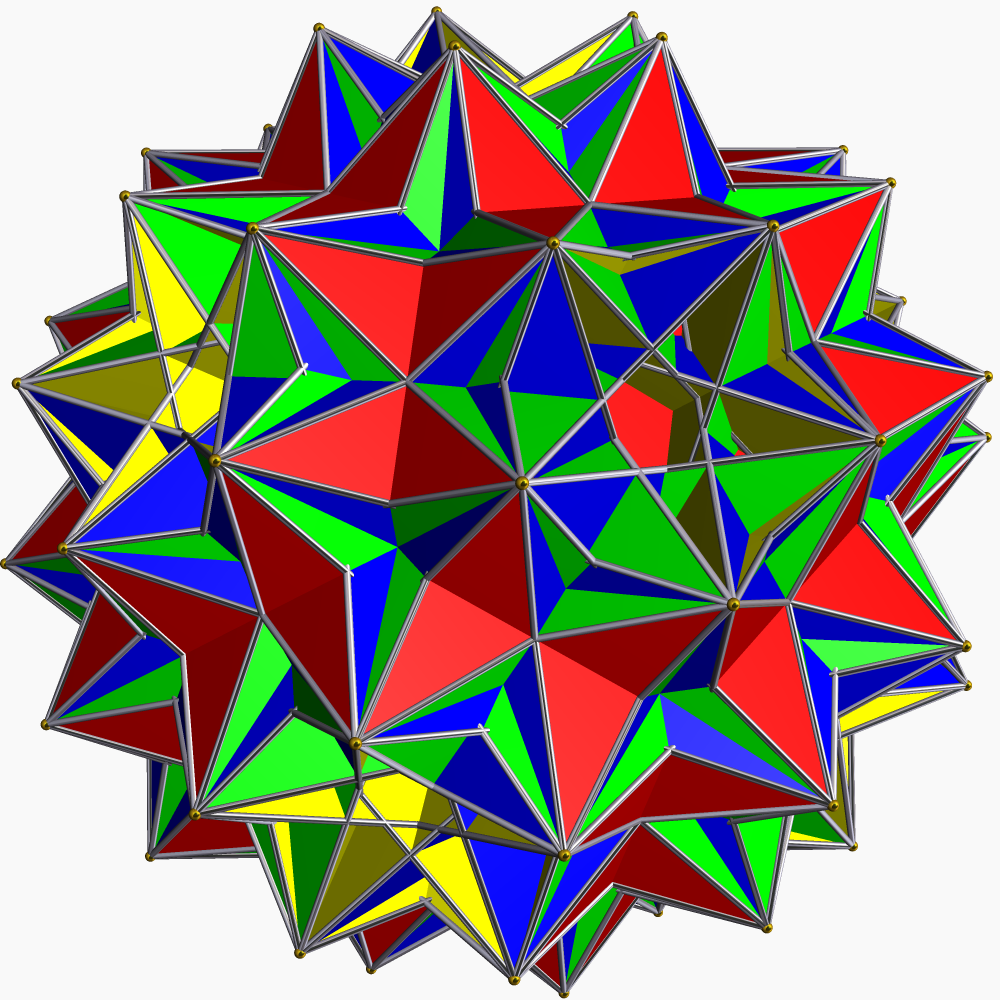

== See also ==
- Star polygon
- List of uniform polyhedra
- List of uniform polyhedra by Schwarz triangle
