= Octahemioctahedron =

Uniform star polyhedron with 12 faces

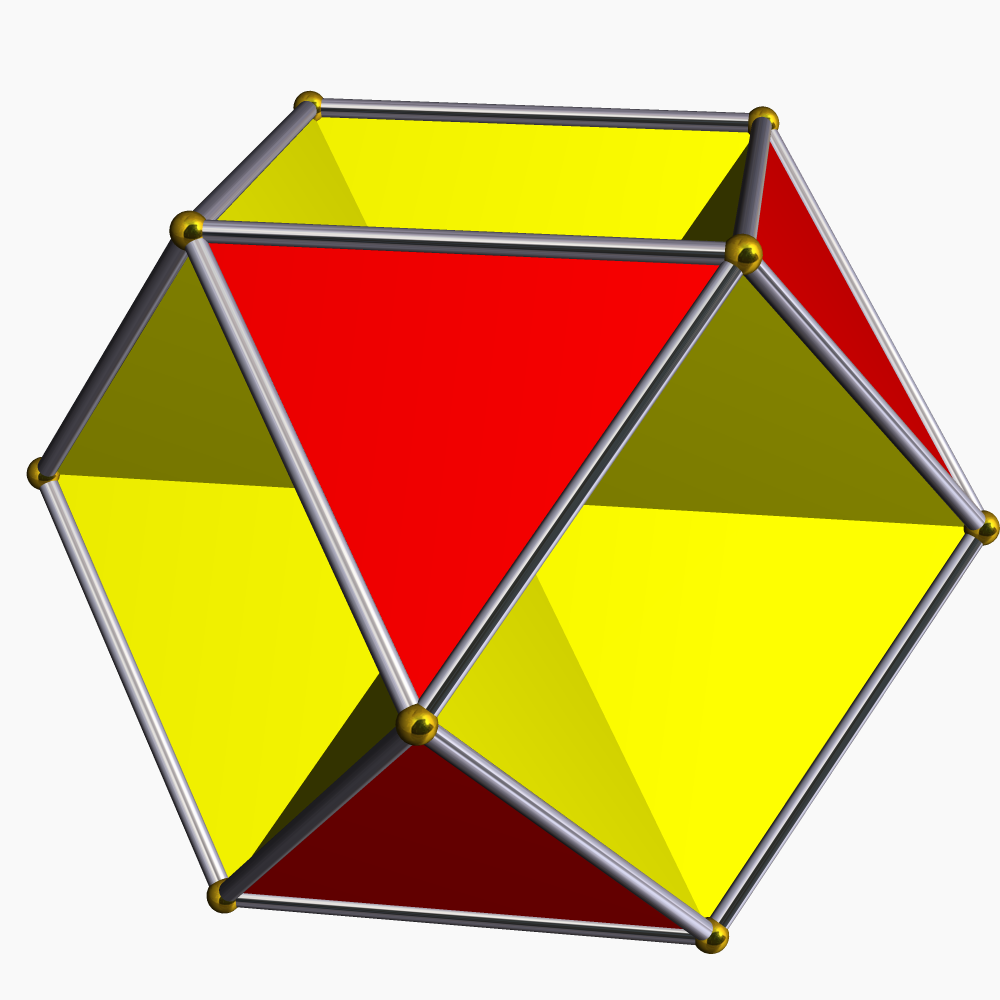
- Type: Non-convex uniform polyhedron
- Faces: 8 triangles 4 hexagons
- Edges: 24
- Vertices: 12
- Wythoff symbol: $\frac{3}{2} \, 3 \mid 3$
- Dual polyhedron: octahemioctacron

3D model of an octahemioctahedron

In geometry, the octahemioctahedron or octatetrahedron is a nonconvex uniform polyhedron, indexed as U_{3}. It contains twelve faces (eight triangles and four hexagons), twenty-four edges, and twelve vertices. Its vertex figure is an antiparallelogram. Since its hexagonal faces pass through its center, it is a hemipolyhedron.

== Construction and properties ==
An octahemioctahedron can be constructed from four diagonals of a cube that bisect the interior into four hexagons, and the edges form the structure of a cuboctahedron. The four hexagonal planes form a polyhedral surface when eight triangles are added. Thus, the resulting polyhedron has 12 faces, 24 edges, and 12 vertices. If six squares replace the triangular faces, the resulting polyhedron becomes a cubohemioctahedron. The octahemioctahedron is a uniform polyhedron, with the vertex figure being an antiparallelogram.

It is the only hemipolyhedron that is orientable, and the only uniform polyhedron with an Euler characteristic of zero, a topological torus.

The octahemioctahedron belongs to a family of concave antiprisms "of the second sort".

== Octahemioctacron ==
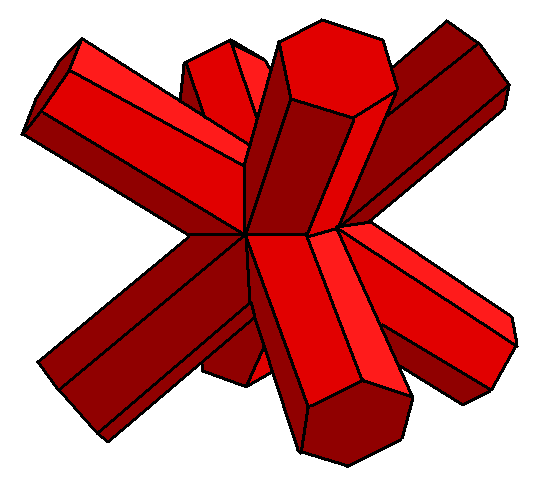
The dual of an octahemioctahedron

The dual of the octahemioctahedron is the octahemioctacron, with its four vertices at infinity. Since the hemipolyhedra have faces passing through the center, the dual figures have corresponding vertices at infinity; properly, on the real projective plane at infinity. Wenninger (2003) stated that they are represented with intersecting prisms, each extending in both directions to the same vertex at infinity, in order to maintain symmetry. In practice, the model prisms are cut off at a certain point that is convenient for the maker. Wenninger suggested these figures are members of a new class of stellation figures, called stellation to infinity. However, Wenninger also suggested that strictly speaking, they are not polyhedra because their construction does not conform to the usual definitions.

== See also ==
- Compound of five octahemioctahedra
- Hemi-cube - The four vertices at infinity correspond directionally to the four vertices of this abstract polyhedron.
