= Great complex icosidodecahedron =

Degenerate uniform star polyhedron

Great complex icosidodecahedron
Type	Uniform star polyhedron
Elements	F = 32, E = 60 (30x2); V = 12 (χ = -16)
Faces by sides	20{3}+12{5/2}
Coxeter diagram	
Wythoff symbol	5 | 3 5/3
Symmetry group	I_{h}, [5,3], *532
Index references	U_{-}, C_{-}, W_{-}
Dual polyhedron	Great complex icosidodecacron
Vertex figure	(3.5/3)^{5} (3.5/2)^{5}/3
Bowers acronym	Gacid

In geometry, the great complex icosidodecahedron is a degenerate uniform star polyhedron. It has 12 vertices, and 60 (doubled) edges, and 32 faces, 12 pentagrams and 20 triangles. All edges are doubled (making it degenerate), sharing 4 faces, but are considered as two overlapping edges as topological polyhedron.

It can be constructed from a number of different vertex figures.

== As a compound ==
The great complex icosidodecahedron can be considered a compound of the small stellated dodecahedron, {5/2,5}, and great icosahedron, {3,5/2}, sharing the same vertices and edges, while the second is hidden, being completely contained inside the first.

Compound polyhedron
Small stellated dodecahedron	Great icosahedron	Compound

== See also ==
- Small complex icosidodecahedron
