= Snub dodecadodecahedron =

Uniform star polyhedron with 84 faces

Snub dodecadodecahedron
Type	Uniform star polyhedron
Elements	F = 84, E = 150; V = 60 (χ = −6)
Faces by sides	60{3}+12{5}+12{5/2}
Coxeter diagram	
Wythoff symbol	| 2 5/2 5
Symmetry group	I, [5,3]^{+}, 532
Index references	U_{40}, C_{49}, W_{111}
Dual polyhedron	Medial pentagonal hexecontahedron
Vertex figure	3.3.5/2.3.5
Bowers acronym	Siddid

3D model of a snub dodecadodecahedron

In geometry, the snub dodecadodecahedron is a nonconvex uniform polyhedron, indexed as U_{40}. It has 84 faces (60 triangles, 12 pentagons, and 12 pentagrams), 150 edges, and 60 vertices. It is given a Schläfli symbol sr{5/2,5}, as a snub great dodecahedron.

== Cartesian coordinates ==
Let $\xi\approx 1.2223809502469911$ be the smallest real zero of the polynomial $P=2x^4-5x^3+3x+1$. Denote by $\phi$ the golden ratio. Let the point $p$ be given by

$$p=
\begin{pmatrix}
\phi^{-2}\xi^2-\phi^{-2}\xi+\phi^{-1}\\
-\phi^{2}\xi^2+\phi^{2}\xi+\phi\\
\xi^2+\xi
\end{pmatrix}$$.

Let the matrix $M$ be given by

$$M=
\begin{pmatrix}
1/2  & -\phi/2 & 1/(2\phi) \\
\phi/2   & 1/(2\phi)     & -1/2 \\
1/(2\phi)     & 1/2  & \phi/2
\end{pmatrix}$$.

$M$ is the rotation around the axis $(1, 0, \phi)$ by an angle of $2\pi/5$, counterclockwise. Let the linear transformations $T_0, \ldots, T_{11}$ be the transformations which send a point $(x, y, z)$ to the even permutations of $(\pm x, \pm y, \pm z)$ with an even number of minus signs. The transformations $T_i$ constitute the group of rotational symmetries of a regular tetrahedron. The transformations $T_i M^j$ $(i = 0,\ldots, 11$, $j = 0,\ldots, 4)$ constitute the group of rotational symmetries of a regular icosahedron. Then the 60 points $T_i M^j p$ are the vertices of a snub dodecadodecahedron. The edge length equals $2(\xi+1)\sqrt{\xi^2-\xi}$, the circumradius equals $(\xi+1)\sqrt{2\xi^2-\xi}$, and the midradius equals $\xi^2+\xi$.

For a great snub icosidodecahedron whose edge length is 1, the circumradius is

$$R = \frac12\sqrt{\frac{2\xi-1}{\xi-1}} \approx 1.2744398820380232$$

Its midradius is

$$r=\frac{1}{2}\sqrt{\frac{\xi}{\xi-1}} \approx 1.1722614951149297$$

The other real root of P plays a similar role in the description of the Inverted snub dodecadodecahedron

== Related polyhedra ==
=== Medial pentagonal hexecontahedron ===
Medial pentagonal hexecontahedron
Type	Star polyhedron
Face	
Elements	F = 60, E = 150; V = 84 (χ = −6)
Symmetry group	I, [5,3]^{+}, 532
Index references	DU_{40}
dual polyhedron	Snub dodecadodecahedron

3D model of a medial pentagonal hexecontahedron

The medial pentagonal hexecontahedron is a nonconvex isohedral polyhedron. It is the dual of the snub dodecadodecahedron. It has 60 intersecting irregular pentagonal faces.

== See also ==
- List of uniform polyhedra
- Inverted snub dodecadodecahedron
