= Great snub dodecicosidodecahedron =

Polyhedron with 104 faces

Great snub dodecicosidodecahedron
Type	Uniform star polyhedron
Elements	F = 104, E = 180; V = 60 (χ = −16)
Faces by sides	(20+60){3}+(12+12){5/2}
Coxeter diagram	
Wythoff symbol	| 5/3 5/2 3
Symmetry group	I, [5,3]^{+}, 532
Index references	U_{64}, C_{80}, W_{115}
Dual polyhedron	Great hexagonal hexecontahedron
Vertex figure	3.3.3.5/2.3.5/3
Bowers acronym	Gisdid

3D model of a great snub dodecicosidodecahedron

In geometry, the great snub dodecicosidodecahedron (or great snub dodekicosidodecahedron) is a nonconvex uniform polyhedron, indexed as U_{64}. It has 104 faces (80 triangles and 24 pentagrams), 180 edges, and 60 vertices. It has Coxeter diagram. It has the unusual feature that its 24 pentagram faces occur in 12 coplanar pairs.

== Cartesian coordinates ==
Let the point $p$ be given by

$$p=
\begin{pmatrix}
\phi^{-\frac12} \\
0 \\
\phi^{-1}
\end{pmatrix}$$,

where $\phi$ is the golden ratio. Let the matrix $M$ be given by

$$M=
\begin{pmatrix}
1/2  & -\phi/2 & 1/(2\phi) \\
\phi/2   & 1/(2\phi)     & -1/2 \\
1/(2\phi)     & 1/2  & \phi/2
\end{pmatrix}$$.

$M$ is the rotation around the axis $(1, 0, \phi)$ by an angle of $2\pi/5$, counterclockwise. Let the linear transformations $T_0, \ldots, T_{11}$ be the transformations which send a point $(x, y, z)$ to the even permutations of $(\pm x, \pm y, \pm z)$ with an even number of minus signs. The transformations $T_i$ constitute the group of rotational symmetries of a regular tetrahedron. The transformations $T_i M^j$ $(i = 0,\ldots, 11$, $j = 0,\ldots, 4)$ constitute the group of rotational symmetries of a regular icosahedron. Then the 60 points $T_i M^j p$ are the vertices of a great snub dodecicosidodecahedron. The edge length equals $\sqrt2$, the circumradius equals $1$, and the midradius equals $\frac12\sqrt2$.

For a great snub dodecicosidodecahedron whose edge length is 1, the circumradius is

$$R = \frac12\sqrt2$$.

Its midradius is

$$r=\frac12$$.

== Related polyhedra ==
It shares its vertices and edges, as well as 20 of its triangular faces and all its pentagrammic faces, with the great dirhombicosidodecahedron, (although the latter has 60 edges not contained in the great snub dodecicosidodecahedron). It shares its other 60 triangular faces (and its pentagrammic faces again) with the great disnub dirhombidodecahedron, alongside all its vertices as well.

The convex hull is a non-uniform rhombicosidodecahedron with rectangles of length ratio 1:$\sqrt\phi$ (which can be decomposed into two Kepler triangles joined at the hypotenuse).

The edges and triangular faces also occur in the compound of twenty octahedra. In addition, 20 of the triangular faces occur in one enantiomer of the compound of twenty tetrahemihexahedra, and the other 60 triangular faces occur in the other enantiomer.

Convex hull	Great snub dodecicosidodecahedron	Great dirhombicosidodecahedron
Great disnub dirhombidodecahedron	Compound of twenty octahedra	Compound of twenty tetrahemihexahedra

== Gallery ==
Traditional filling	Modulo-2 filling

== See also ==
- List of uniform polyhedra
