= Great disnub dirhombidodecahedron =

Uniform star polyhedron with 204 faces

Great disnub dirhombidodecahedron
Type	Uniform star polyhedron
Elements	F = 204, E = 360; V = 60 (χ = −96)
Faces by sides	120{3}+60{4}+24{5/2}
Coxeter diagram	{{{Skilling-Coxeter}}}
Wythoff symbol	| (3/2) 5/3 (3) 5/2
Symmetry group	I_{h}, [5,3], *532
Index references	U_{-}, C_{-}, W_{-}
Dual polyhedron	Great disnub dirhombidodecacron
Vertex figure	(5/2.4.3.3.3.4. 5/3.4.3/2.3/2.3/2.4)/_{2}
Bowers acronym	Gidisdrid

3D model of a great disnub dirhombidodecahedron

In geometry, the great disnub dirhombidodecahedron, also called Skilling's figure, is a degenerate uniform star polyhedron. Its full realization has 204 faces (120 triangles, 60 squares, and 24 pentagrams), 360 edges, and 60 vertices. 6 triangles, 4 squares, and 2 pentagrams meet at each vertex. Due to its geometric realization having some double edges where 4 faces meet, it is not strictly a uniform polyhedron, but rather considered a degenerate uniform polyhedron.

== Properties ==
It was proven in 1970 that there are only 75 uniform polyhedra other than the infinite families of prisms and antiprisms. John Skilling discovered another degenerate example by relaxing the condition that edges must be single, the great disnub dirhombidodecahedron. More precisely, he allowed any even number of faces to meet at each edge, as long as the set of faces couldn't be separated into two connected sets.

The number of edges can be considered ambiguous, because the underlying abstract polyhedron has 360 edges, but 120 pairs of these have the same image in the geometric realization, so that the geometric realization has 120 single edges and 120 double edges where 4 faces meet, for a total of 240 edges. The vertex figure has 4 square faces passing through the center of the model.

The Euler characteristic of the abstract polyhedron is −96. If the pairs of coinciding edges in the geometric realization are considered to be single edges, then it has only 240 edges and Euler characteristic 24.

=== Related polyhedra ===
It shares the same edge arrangement as the great dirhombicosidodecahedron, but has a different set of triangular faces. The vertices and edges are also shared with the uniform compounds of twenty octahedra or twenty tetrahemihexahedra. 180 of the edges are shared with the great snub dodecicosidodecahedron.

Convex hull	Great snub dodecicosidodecahedron	Great dirhombicosidodecahedron
Great disnub dirhombidodecahedron	Compound of twenty octahedra	Compound of twenty tetrahemihexahedra

It may be constructed as the exclusive or (blend) of the great dirhombicosidodecahedron and compound of twenty octahedra.

=== Dual polyhedron ===
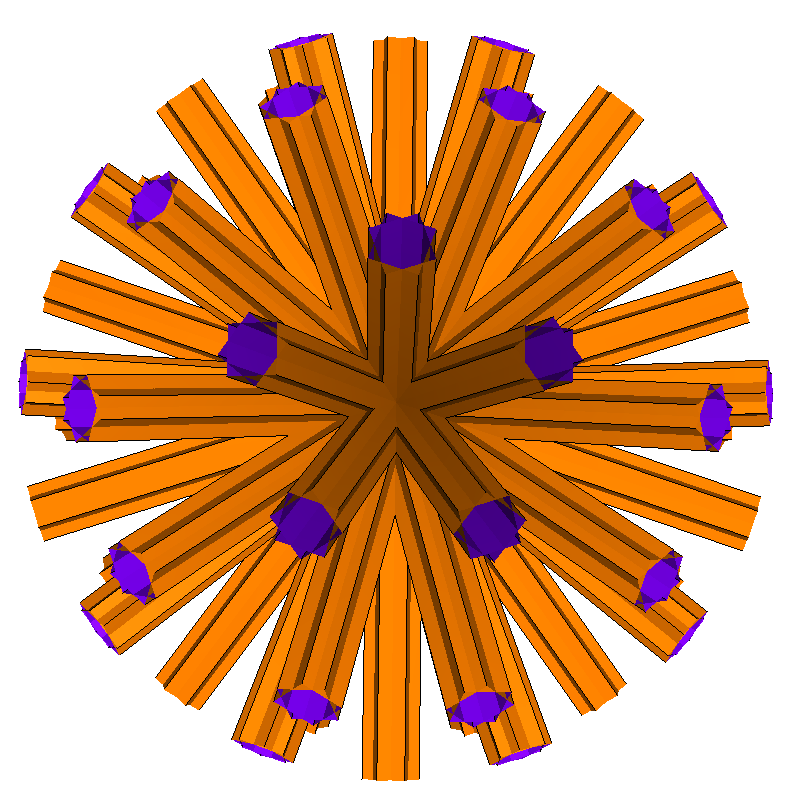
The great disnub dirhombidodecacron

The dual of the great disnub dirhombidodecahedron is called the great disnub dirhombidodecacron. It is a nonconvex infinite isohedral polyhedron.

Like the visually identical great dirhombicosidodecacron in Magnus Wenninger's Dual Models, it is represented with intersecting infinite prisms passing through the model center, cut off at a certain point that is convenient for the maker. Wenninger suggested these figures are members of a new class of stellation polyhedra, called stellation to infinity. However, he also acknowledged that strictly speaking they are not polyhedra because their construction does not conform to the usual definitions.

== Gallery ==
Traditional filling	Modulo-2 filling

== See also ==
- List of uniform polyhedra
