= Great dodecicosahedron =

Polyhedron with 32 faces

Great dodecicosahedron
Type	Uniform star polyhedron
Elements	F = 32, E = 120; V = 60 (χ = −28)
Faces by sides	20{6}+12{10/3}
Coxeter diagram	(with extra double-covered triangles) (with extra double-covered pentagons)
Wythoff symbol	3 5/3 (3/2 5/2) |
Symmetry group	I_{h}, [5,3], *532
Index references	U_{63}, C_{79}, W_{101}
Dual polyhedron	Great dodecicosacron
Vertex figure	6.10/3.6/5.10/7
Bowers acronym	Giddy

3D model of a great dodecicosahedron

In geometry, the great dodecicosahedron (or great dodekicosahedron) is a nonconvex uniform polyhedron, indexed as U_{63}. It has 32 faces (20 hexagons and 12 decagrams), 120 edges, and 60 vertices. Its vertex figure is a crossed quadrilateral.

It has a composite Wythoff symbol, 3 5/3 (3/2 5/2) |, requiring two different Schwarz triangles to generate it: (3 5/3 3/2) and (3 5/3 5/2). (3 5/3 5/2 | represents the great dodecicosahedron with an extra 12 {10/2} pentagons, and 3 5/3 3/2 | represents it with an extra 20 {6/2} triangles.)

Its vertex figure 6.10/3.6/5.10/7 is also ambiguous, having two clockwise and two counterclockwise faces around each vertex.

== Related polyhedra ==
It shares its vertex arrangement with the truncated dodecahedron. It additionally shares its edge arrangement with the great icosicosidodecahedron (having the hexagonal faces in common) and the great ditrigonal dodecicosidodecahedron (having the decagrammic faces in common).

Truncated dodecahedron	Great icosicosidodecahedron	Great ditrigonal dodecicosidodecahedron	Great dodecicosahedron

== Gallery ==
Traditional filling	Modulo-2 filling

== See also ==
- List of uniform polyhedra
