= Inverted snub dodecadodecahedron =

Polyhedron with 84 faces

Inverted snub dodecadodecahedron
Type	Uniform star polyhedron
Elements	F = 84, E = 150; V = 60 (χ = −6)
Faces by sides	60{3}+12{5}+12{5/2}
Coxeter diagram	
Wythoff symbol	| 5/3 2 5
Symmetry group	I, [5,3]^{+}, 532
Index references	U_{60}, C_{76}, W_{114}
Dual polyhedron	Medial inverted pentagonal hexecontahedron
Vertex figure	3.3.5.3.5/3
Bowers acronym	Isdid

3D model of an inverted snub dodecadodecahedron

In geometry, the inverted snub dodecadodecahedron (or vertisnub dodecadodecahedron) is a nonconvex uniform polyhedron, indexed as U_{60}. It is given a Schläfli symbol sr{5/3,5}.

== Cartesian coordinates ==
Let $\xi\approx 2.109759446579943$ be the largest real zero of the polynomial $P=2x^4-5x^3+3x+1$. Denote by $\phi$ the golden ratio. Let the point $p$ be given by

$$p=
\begin{pmatrix}
\phi^{-2}\xi^2-\phi^{-2}\xi+\phi^{-1}\\
-\phi^{2}\xi^2+\phi^{2}\xi+\phi\\
\xi^2+\xi
\end{pmatrix}$$.

Let the matrix $M$ be given by

$$M=
\begin{pmatrix}
1/2  & -\phi/2 & 1/(2\phi) \\
\phi/2   & 1/(2\phi)     & -1/2 \\
1/(2\phi)     & 1/2  & \phi/2
\end{pmatrix}$$.

$M$ is the rotation around the axis $(1, 0, \phi)$ by an angle of $2\pi/5$, counterclockwise. Let the linear transformations $T_0, \ldots, T_{11}$ be the transformations which send a point $(x, y, z)$ to the even permutations of $(\pm x, \pm y, \pm z)$ with an even number of minus signs. The transformations $T_i$ constitute the group of rotational symmetries of a regular tetrahedron. The transformations $T_i M^j$ $(i = 0,\ldots, 11$, $j = 0,\ldots, 4)$ constitute the group of rotational symmetries of a regular icosahedron. Then the 60 points $T_i M^j p$ are the vertices of a snub dodecadodecahedron. The edge length equals $2(\xi+1)\sqrt{\xi^2-\xi}$, the circumradius equals $(\xi+1)\sqrt{2\xi^2-\xi}$, and the midradius equals $\xi^2+\xi$.

For a great snub icosidodecahedron whose edge length is 1, the circumradius is

$$R = \frac12\sqrt{\frac{2\xi-1}{\xi-1}} \approx 0.8516302281174128$$

Its midradius is

$$r=\frac{1}{2}\sqrt{\frac{\xi}{\xi-1}} \approx 0.6894012223976083$$

The other real root of P plays a similar role in the description of the snub dodecadodecahedron.

== Related polyhedra ==
=== Medial inverted pentagonal hexecontahedron ===
Medial inverted pentagonal hexecontahedron
Type	Star polyhedron
Face	
Elements	F = 60, E = 150; V = 84 (χ = −6)
Symmetry group	I, [5,3]^{+}, 532
Index references	DU_{60}
dual polyhedron	Inverted snub dodecadodecahedron

3D model of a medial inverted pentagonal hexecontahedron

The medial inverted pentagonal hexecontahedron (or midly petaloid ditriacontahedron) is a nonconvex isohedral polyhedron. It is the dual of the uniform inverted snub dodecadodecahedron. Its faces are irregular nonconvex pentagons, with one very acute angle.

== Proportions ==
Denote the golden ratio by $\phi$, and let $\xi\approx -0.236\,993\,843\,45$ be the largest (least negative) real zero of the polynomial $P=8x^4-12x^3+5x+1$. Then each face has three equal angles of $\arccos(\xi)\approx 103.709\,182\,219\,53^{\circ}$, one of $\arccos(\phi^2\xi+\phi)\approx 3.990\,130\,423\,41^{\circ}$ and one of $360^{\circ}-\arccos(\phi^{-2}\xi-\phi^{-1})\approx 224.882\,322\,917\,99^{\circ}$. Each face has one medium length edge, two short and two long ones. If the medium length is $2$, then the short edges have length
$$1-\sqrt{\frac{1-\xi}{\phi^3-\xi}}\approx 0.474\,126\,460\,54,$$
and the long edges have length
$$1+\sqrt{\frac{1-\xi}{\phi^{-3}-\xi}} \approx  37.551\,879\,448\,54.$$
The dihedral angle equals $\arccos(\xi/(\xi+1))\approx 108.095\,719\,352\,34^{\circ}$. The other real zero of the polynomial $P$ plays a similar role for the medial pentagonal hexecontahedron.

== See also ==
- List of uniform polyhedra
- Snub dodecadodecahedron
