= Great ditrigonal dodecicosidodecahedron =

Polyhedron with 44 faces

Great ditrigonal dodecicosidodecahedron
| Type | Uniform star polyhedron |
| Elements | F = 44, E = 120; V = 60 (χ = −16) |
| Faces by sides | 20{3}+12{5}+12{10/3} |
| Coxeter diagram | |
| Wythoff symbol | 3 5 | 5/3; 5/4 3/2 | 5/3 |
| Symmetry group | I_{h}, [5,3], *532 |
| Index references | U_{42}, C_{54}, W_{81} |
| Dual polyhedron | Great ditrigonal dodecacronic hexecontahedron |
| Vertex figure | 3.10/3.5.10/3 |
| Bowers acronym | Gidditdid |

3D model of a great ditrigonal dodecicosidodecahedron

In geometry, the great ditrigonal dodecicosidodecahedron (or great dodekified icosidodecahedron) is a nonconvex uniform polyhedron, indexed as U_{42}. It has 44 faces (20 triangles, 12 pentagons, and 12 decagrams), 120 edges, and 60 vertices. Its vertex figure is an isosceles trapezoid.

== Related polyhedra ==
It shares its vertex arrangement with the truncated dodecahedron. It additionally shares its edge arrangement with the great icosicosidodecahedron (having the triangular and pentagonal faces in common) and the great dodecicosahedron (having the decagrammic faces in common).

| Truncated dodecahedron | Great icosicosidodecahedron | Great ditrigonal dodecicosidodecahedron | Great dodecicosahedron |

== See also ==
- List of uniform polyhedra
