= Small complex icosidodecahedron =

Small complex icosidodecahedron
Type	Uniform star polyhedron
Elements	F = 32, E = 60 (30x2); V = 12 (χ = −16)
Faces by sides	20{3}+12{5}
Coxeter diagram	
Wythoff symbol	5 | 3/2 5
Symmetry group	I_{h}, [5,3], *532
Index references	U_{-}, C_{-}, W_{-}
Dual polyhedron	Small complex icosidodecacron
Vertex figure	(3/2.5)^{5} (3.5)^{5}/3
Bowers acronym	Cid

In geometry, the small complex icosidodecahedron is a degenerate uniform star polyhedron. Its edges are doubled, making it degenerate. The star has 32 faces (20 triangles and 12 pentagons), 60 (doubled) edges and 12 vertices and 4 sharing faces. The faces in it are considered as two overlapping edges as topological polyhedron.

A small complex icosidodecahedron can be constructed from a number of different vertex figures.

A very similar figure emerges as a geometrical truncation of the great stellated dodecahedron, where the pentagram faces become doubly-wound pentagons (t{5/2} = {10/2}), making the internal pentagonal planes, and the three meeting at each vertex become triangles, making the external triangular planes.

== As a compound ==
The small complex icosidodecahedron can be seen as a compound of the icosahedron {3,5} and the great dodecahedron {5,5/2} where all vertices are precise and edges coincide. The small complex icosidodecahedron resembles an icosahedron, because the great dodecahedron is completely contained inside the icosahedron.

Compound polyhedron
Icosahedron	Great dodecahedron	Compound

Its two-dimensional analogue would be the compound of a regular pentagon, {5}, representing the icosahedron as the n-dimensional pentagonal polytope, and regular pentagram, {5/2}, as the n-dimensional star. These shapes would share vertices, similarly to how its 3D equivalent shares edges.

Compound polygon
Pentagon	Pentagram	Compound

== See also ==
- Great complex icosidodecahedron
