= Tetrahemihexahedron =

Polyhedron with 7 faces

- Type: nonconvex uniform hemipolyhedron
- Faces: 7
- Edges: 12
- Vertices: 6
- Euler char.: 1
- Wythoff symbol: $\frac{3}{2} \, 3 \mid 2$
- Symmetry group: $T_d$
- Dihedral angle (degrees): 54.736°
- Dual polyhedron: Tetrahemihexacron

In geometry, the tetrahemihexahedron or hemicuboctahedron is a uniform star polyhedron, indexed as U_{4}. It has 7 faces (4 triangles and 3 squares), 12 edges, and 6 vertices. Its vertex figure is a crossed quadrilateral. Its Coxeter–Dynkin diagram is (although this is a double covering of the tetrahemihexahedron).

The tetrahemihexahedron is the only non-prismatic uniform polyhedron with an odd number of faces. Its Wythoff symbol is 3/2 3 | 2, but that represents a double covering of the tetrahemihexahedron with eight triangles and six squares, paired and coinciding in space. (It can more intuitively be seen as two coinciding tetrahemihexahedra.)

The tetrahemihexahedron is a hemipolyhedron. The "hemi" part of the name means some of the faces form a group with half as many members as some regular polyhedron—here, three square faces form a group with half as many faces as the regular hexahedron, better known as the cube—hence hemihexahedron. Hemi faces are also oriented in the same direction as the regular polyhedron's faces. The three square faces of the tetrahemihexahedron are, like the three facial orientations of the cube, mutually perpendicular.

The "half-as-many" characteristic also means that hemi faces must pass through the center of the polyhedron, where they all intersect each other. Visually, each square is divided into four right triangles, with two visible from each side.

== Construction and properties ==
3D model of a tetrahemihexahedron

A tetrahemihexahedron can be constructed from the skeleton of a regular octahedron with three square planes as its diagonals. Furthermore, add four equilateral triangle faces, but without two of them meeting along the edge of an octahedron. Another similar construction of the tetrahemihexahedron is by faceting of an octahedron; this means that it removes alternate triangular faces of an octahedron, leaving three squares that again as the diagonal. Because of these constructions, it has tetrahedral symmetry $\mathrm{T}_\mathrm{d}$. The tetrahemihexahedron is a uniform polyhedron, because of having regular polygonal faces and vertex-transitive—any vertex can be mapped isometrically onto another. Since the faces are intersecting each other, the tetrahemihexahedron is a nonconvex uniform polyhedron indexed as $U_{04}$.

A tetrahemihexahedron has six vertices, twelve edges, and seven faces (that is, four equilateral triangles and three squares), resulting in the Euler characteristic being one. Its vertex figure may be represented as the antiparallelogram, a type of self-crossed quadrilateral. It is 2-covered by the cuboctahedron, meaning that it has the same abstract vertex figure as a cuboctahedron wherein each vertex is surrounded by two triangles and two squares alternatingly, denoted as $3.4.3.4$, and double the vertices, edges, and faces. It has the same topology as the abstract polyhedron, the hemi-cuboctahedron.

The tetrahemihexahedron is a non-orientable surface. It is projective polyhedron, yielding a representation of the real projective plane very similar to the Roman surface.

The tetrahemihexahedron may also be constructed as a crossed triangular cuploid. All cuploids and their duals are topologically projective planes.

Family of star-cuploids
3	5	7	n/d
{3/2} Crossed triangular cuploid (upside down)	{5/2} Pentagrammic cuploid	{7/2} Heptagrammic cuploid	2
—	{5/4} Crossed pentagonal cuploid (upside down)	{7/4} Crossed heptagrammic cuploid	4

== Dual polyhedron ==
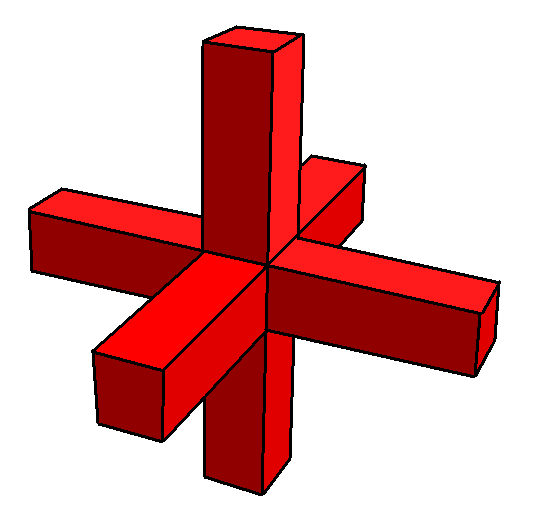
Tetrahemihexacron

The tetrahemihexacron is the dual of the tetrahemihexahedron, and is one of nine dual hemipolyhedra. Since the hemipolyhedra have faces passing through the center, the dual figures have corresponding vertices at infinity; properly, on the real projective plane at infinity. Wenninger (2003) suggested that they are represented with intersecting prisms, each extending in both directions to the same vertex at infinity, in order to maintain symmetry. In practice, the model prisms are cut off at a certain point that is convenient for the maker. Wenninger suggested these figures are members of a new class of stellation figures, called "stellation to infinity". However, he also suggested that strictly speaking, they are not polyhedra because their construction does not conform to the usual definitions.

A Tetrahemihexacron at a reasonable distance

Topologically, the tetrahemihexacron is considered to contain seven vertices. The three vertices considered at infinity (the real projective plane at infinity) correspond directionally to the three vertices of the hemi-octahedron, an abstract polyhedron. The other four vertices exist at alternate corners of a central cube (a demicube, in this case a tetrahedron).
