= Great icosicosidodecahedron =

Polyhedron with 52 faces

Great icosicosidodecahedron
Type	Uniform star polyhedron
Elements	F = 52, E = 120; V = 60 (χ = −8)
Faces by sides	20{3}+12{5}+20{6}
Coxeter diagram	
Wythoff symbol	3/2 5 | 3; 3 5/4 | 3
Symmetry group	I_{h}, [5,3], *532
Index references	U_{48}, C_{62}, W_{88}
Dual polyhedron	Great icosacronic hexecontahedron
Vertex figure	5.6.3/2.6
Bowers acronym	Giid

3D model of a great icosicosidodecahedron

In geometry, the great icosicosidodecahedron (or great icosified icosidodecahedron) is a nonconvex uniform polyhedron, indexed as U_{48}. It has 52 faces (20 triangles, 12 pentagons, and 20 hexagons), 120 edges, and 60 vertices. Its vertex figure is a crossed quadrilateral.

== Related polyhedra ==
It shares its vertex arrangement with the truncated dodecahedron. It additionally shares its edge arrangement with the great ditrigonal dodecicosidodecahedron (having the triangular and pentagonal faces in common) and the great dodecicosahedron (having the hexagonal faces in common).

Truncated dodecahedron	Great icosicosidodecahedron	Great ditrigonal dodecicosidodecahedron	Great dodecicosahedron
