= Small stellated dodecahedron =

Kepler–Poinsot polyhedron

- Type: Kepler–Poinsot polyhedron
- Faces: 12 pentagrams
- Edges: 30
- Vertices: 12
- Schläfli symbol: {5/2, 5}
- Dual polyhedron: great dodecahedron

3D model of a small stellated dodecahedron

In geometry, the small stellated dodecahedron is a Kepler–Poinsot polyhedron, named by Arthur Cayley, and with Schläfli symbol {5/2, 5}. It is one of four nonconvex regular polyhedra. It is composed of 12 pentagrammic faces, with five pentagrams meeting at each vertex.

It shares the same vertex arrangement as the convex regular icosahedron. It also shares the same edge arrangement with the great icosahedron, with which it forms a degenerate uniform compound figure.

It is the second of four stellations of the dodecahedron (including the original dodecahedron itself).

The small stellated dodecahedron can be constructed analogously to the pentagram, its two-dimensional analogue, via the extension of the edges (1-faces) of the core polytope until a point is reached where they intersect.

== Construction and properties ==
The small stellated dodecahedron is constructed by attaching twelve pentagonal pyramids onto a regular dodecahedron's faces. Suppose the pentagrammic faces are considered as five triangular faces. In that case, it shares the same surface topology as the pentakis dodecahedron, but with much taller isosceles triangle faces, with the height of the pentagonal pyramids adjusted so that the five triangles in the pentagram become coplanar. The critical angle is atan(2) above the dodecahedron face. Equivalently, this occurs when the height of the pyramids is equal to $\cot(36^\circ)=\sqrt{\frac{5+2\sqrt5}{5}}$ times the dodecahedron's edge length.

A small stellated dodecahedron rotating

Regarding the small stellated dodecahedron has 12 pentagrams as faces, with these pentagrams meeting at 30 edges and 12 vertices, one can compute its genus using Euler's formula
$$V - E + F = 2 - 2g$$
and conclude that the small stellated dodecahedron has genus 4. This observation, made by Louis Poinsot, was initially confusing, but Felix Klein showed in 1877 that the small stellated dodecahedron could be seen as a branched covering of the Riemann sphere by a Riemann surface of genus 4, with branch points at the center of each pentagram. This Riemann surface, called Bring's curve, has the greatest number of symmetries of any Riemann surface of genus 4: the symmetric group $S_5$ acts as automorphisms.

The dual polyhedron of a small stellated dodecahedron is the great dodecahedron which shares the same number of vertices, edges, and faces.

== In art and popular cultures ==
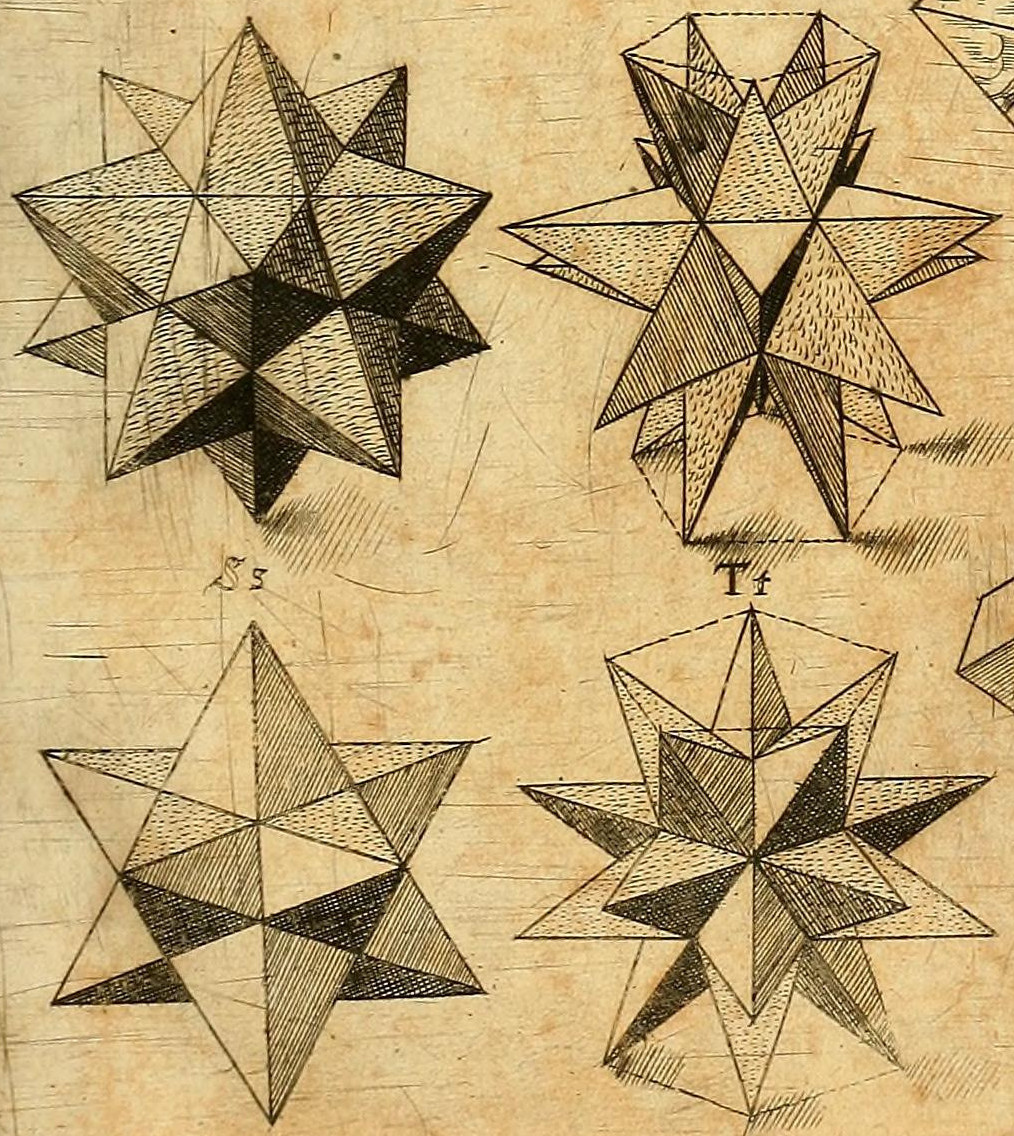
Small stellated dodecahedron (top and bottom left) in Johannes Kepler's Harmonices Mundi

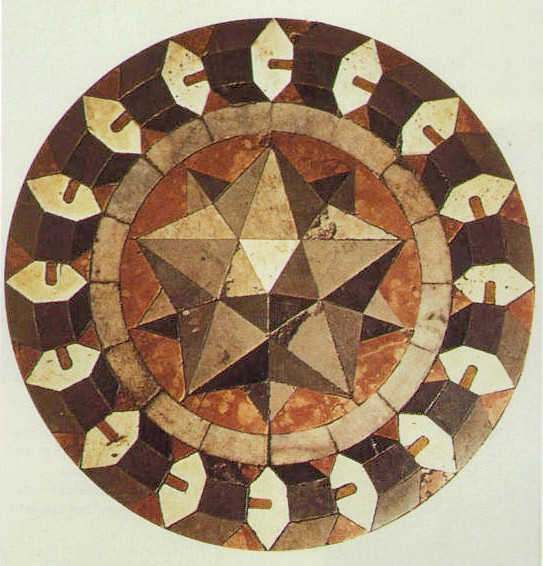
Floor mosaic by Paolo Uccello, featuring a small stellated dodecahedron

Small stellated dodecahedra can be seen in antiquity, as in Johannes Kepler's Harmonices Mundi, and a floor mosaic in Paolo Uccello's St Mark's Basilica c. 1430. The same shape is central to two lithographs by M. C. Escher: Contrast (Order and Chaos) (1950) and Gravitation (1952).

== Formulas ==
For a small stellated dodecahedron with edge length E,

Inradius:	$\quad E \times \frac{\sqrt{250+110\sqrt{5}}}{2}$
Midradius:	$\quad E \times \frac{3+\sqrt{5}}{4}$
Circumradius:	$\quad E \times \frac{\sqrt{50+22\sqrt{5}}}{4}$
Surface area:	$\quad E^2 \times 15\sqrt{5+2\sqrt{5}}$
Volume:	$\quad E^3 \times \frac{35+15\sqrt{5}}{4}$

== Related polyhedra ==
Animated truncation sequence from {5/2,5} to {5,5/2}.

Its convex hull is the regular convex icosahedron. It also shares its edges with the great icosahedron; the compound with both is the great complex icosidodecahedron.

There are four related uniform polyhedra, constructed as degrees of truncation. The dual is a great dodecahedron. The dodecadodecahedron is a rectification, where edges are truncated down to points.

The truncated small stellated dodecahedron can be considered a degenerate uniform polyhedron since edges and vertices coincide, but it is included for completeness. Visually, it looks like a regular dodecahedron on the surface, but it has 24 faces in overlapping pairs. The spikes are truncated until they reach the plane of the pentagram beneath them. The 24 faces are 12 pentagons from the truncated vertices and 12 decagons taking the form of doubly-wound pentagons overlapping the first 12 pentagons. The latter faces are formed by truncating the original pentagrams. When an {n/d}-gon is truncated, it becomes a {2n/d}-gon. For example, a truncated pentagon {5/1} becomes a decagon {10/1}, so truncating a pentagram {5/2} becomes a doubly-wound pentagon {10/2} (the common factor between 10 and 2 mean we visit each vertex twice to complete the polygon).

Stellations of the dodecahedron
Platonic solid	Kepler–Poinsot solids		
Dodecahedron	Small stellated dodecahedron	Great dodecahedron	Great stellated dodecahedron

Name	Small stellated dodecahedron	Truncated small stellated dodecahedron	Dodecadodecahedron	Truncated great dodecahedron	Great dodecahedron
Coxeter–Dynkin diagram					
Picture					

== See also ==
- Compound of small stellated dodecahedron and great dodecahedron
