= U45 =

U45 may refer to:

- Aeroflot Flight U-45
- German submarine U-45, various vessels
- HMS Wild Goose (U45), a sloop of the Royal Navy
- Icositruncated dodecadodecahedron
- Small nucleolar RNA SNORD45
- U45, a line of the Dortmund Stadtbahn
