= W98 =

W98 may refer to:

- SS W 98, an Empire ship
- Truncated dodecadodecahedron
- Windows 98, an operating system
