= Stellated dodecahedron =

There are 3 non-trivial stellations of the dodecahedron:

- Small stellated dodecahedron
- Great dodecahedron
- Great stellated dodecahedron
