= Tridyakis icosahedron =

Polyhedron with 120 faces

Tridyakis icosahedron
Type	Star polyhedron
Face	
Elements	F = 120, E = 180; V = 44 (χ = −16)
Symmetry group	I_{h}, [5,3], *532
Index references	DU_{45}
dual polyhedron	Icositruncated dodecadodecahedron

3D model of a tridyakis icosahedron

In geometry, the tridyakis icosahedron is the dual polyhedron of the nonconvex uniform polyhedron, icositruncated dodecadodecahedron. It has 44 vertices, 180 edges, and 120 scalene triangular faces.

== Proportions ==
The triangles have one angle of $\arccos(\frac{3}{5})\approx 53.130\,102\,354\,16^{\circ}$, one of $\arccos(\frac{1}{3}+\frac{4}{15}\sqrt{5})\approx 21.624\,633\,927\,143^{\circ}$ and one of $\arccos(\frac{1}{3}-\frac{4}{15}\sqrt{5})\approx 105.245\,263\,718\,70^{\circ}$. The dihedral angle equals $\arccos(-\frac{7}{8})\approx 151.044\,975\,628\,14^{\circ}$. Part of each triangle lies within the solid, hence is invisible in solid models.

== See also ==
- Catalan solid Duals to convex uniform polyhedra
- Uniform polyhedra
- List of uniform polyhedra
