= Great dodecahemidodecahedron =

Polyhedron with 18 faces

Great dodecahemidodecahedron
Type	Uniform star polyhedron
Elements	F = 18, E = 60; V = 30 (χ = −12)
Faces by sides	12{5/2}+6{10/3}
Coxeter diagram	
Wythoff symbol	5/3 5/2 | 5/3 (double covering)
Symmetry group	I_{h}, [5,3], *532
Index references	U_{70}, C_{86}, W_{107}
Dual polyhedron	Great dodecahemidodecacron
Vertex figure	5/2.10/3.5/3.10/3
Bowers acronym	Gidhid

3D model of a great dodecahemidodecahedron

In geometry, the great dodecahemidodecahedron is a nonconvex uniform polyhedron, indexed as U_{70}. It has 18 faces (12 pentagrams and 6 decagrams), 60 edges, and 30 vertices. Its vertex figure is a crossed quadrilateral.

Aside from the regular small stellated dodecahedron {^{5}/_{2},5} and great stellated dodecahedron {^{5}/_{2},3}, it is the only nonconvex uniform polyhedron whose faces are all non-convex regular polygons (star polygons), namely the star polygons {^{5}/_{2}} and {^{10}/_{3}}.

It is a hemipolyhedron with 6 decagrammic faces passing through the model center.

== Related polyhedra ==
Its convex hull is the icosidodecahedron. It also shares its edge arrangement with the great icosidodecahedron (having the pentagrammic faces in common) and the great icosihemidodecahedron (having the decagrammic faces in common).

Great icosidodecahedron	Great dodecahemidodecahedron	Great icosihemidodecahedron
Icosidodecahedron (convex hull)

== Gallery ==
Traditional filling	Modulo-2 filling

== See also ==
- List of uniform polyhedra
