= Truncated great icosahedron =

Polyhedron with 32 faces

Truncated great icosahedron
Type	Uniform star polyhedron
Elements	F = 32, E = 90; V = 60 (χ = 2)
Faces by sides	12{5/2}+20{6}
Coxeter diagram	
Wythoff symbol	2 5/2 | 3; 2 5/3 | 3
Symmetry group	I_{h}, [5,3], *532
Index references	U_{55}, C_{71}, W_{95}
Dual polyhedron	Great stellapentakis dodecahedron
Vertex figure	6.6.5/2
Bowers acronym	Tiggy

3D model of a truncated great icosahedron

In geometry, the truncated great icosahedron (or great truncated icosahedron) is a nonconvex uniform polyhedron, indexed as U_{55}. It has 32 faces (12 pentagrams and 20 hexagons), 90 edges, and 60 vertices. It is given a Schläfli symbol t{3,5/2} or t_{0,1}{3,5/2} as a truncated great icosahedron.

== Cartesian coordinates ==
Cartesian coordinates for the vertices of a truncated great icosahedron centered at the origin are all the even permutations of

$$\begin{array}{crccc}
\Bigl(& \pm\,1,& 0,& \pm\,\frac{3}{\varphi} &\Bigr) \\
\Bigl(& \pm\,2,& \pm\,\frac{1}{\varphi},& \pm\,\frac{1}{\varphi^3} &\Bigr) \\
\Bigl(& \pm \bigl[1+\frac{1}{\varphi^2}\bigr],& \pm\,1,& \pm\,\frac{2}{\varphi} &\Bigr)
\end{array}$$

where $\varphi = \tfrac{1+\sqrt 5}{2}$ is the golden ratio. Using $\tfrac{1}{\varphi^2} = 1 - \tfrac{1}{\varphi}$ one verifies that all vertices are on a sphere, centered at the origin, with the radius squared equal to $10-\tfrac{9}{\varphi}.$ The edges have length 2.

== Related polyhedra ==
This polyhedron is the truncation of the great icosahedron:

The truncated great stellated dodecahedron is a degenerate polyhedron, with 20 triangular faces from the truncated vertices, and 12 (hidden) pentagonal faces as truncations of the original pentagram faces, the latter forming a great dodecahedron inscribed within and sharing the edges of the icosahedron.

Name	Great stellated dodecahedron	Truncated great stellated dodecahedron	Great icosidodecahedron	Truncated great icosahedron	Great icosahedron
Coxeter-Dynkin diagram					
Picture					

=== Great stellapentakis dodecahedron ===
Great stellapentakis dodecahedron
Type	Star polyhedron
Face	
Elements	F = 60, E = 90; V = 32 (χ = 2)
Symmetry group	I_{h}, [5,3], *532
Index references	DU_{55}
dual polyhedron	Truncated great icosahedron

3D model of a great stellapentakis dodecahedron

The great stellapentakis dodecahedron is a nonconvex isohedral polyhedron. It is the dual of the truncated great icosahedron. It has 60 intersecting triangular faces.

== See also ==
- List of uniform polyhedra
