= Compound of five tetrahemihexahedra =

Polyhedral compound

Compound of five tetrahemihexahedra
Type	Uniform compound
Index	UC_{18}
Polyhedra	5 tetrahemihexahedra
Faces	20 triangles, 15 squares
Edges	60
Vertices	30
Symmetry group	chiral icosahedral (I)
Subgroup restricting to one constituent	chiral tetrahedral (T)

A compound of five tetrahemihexahedra is a uniform polyhedron compound and a symmetric arrangement of five tetrahemihexahedra. It could be also called a hemirhombichiricosahedron. It is chiral with icosahedral symmetry (I).

== Related polyhedra ==
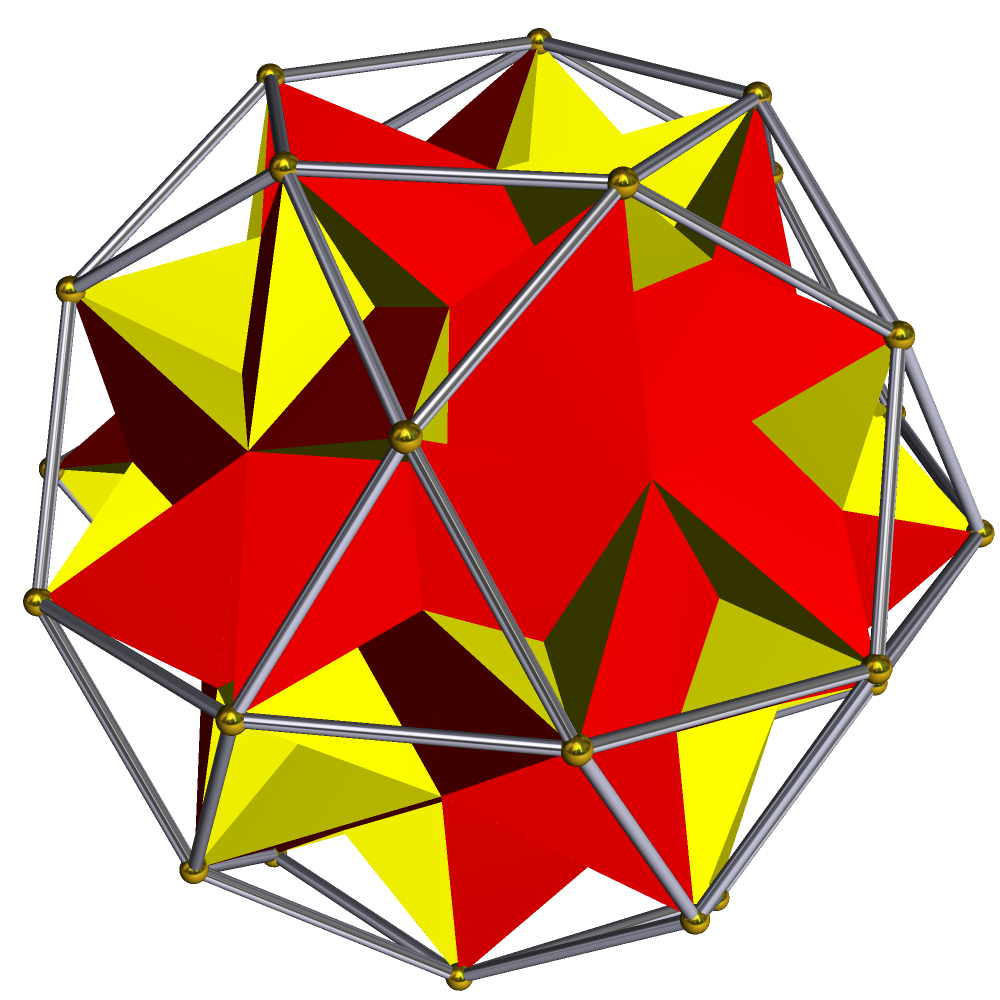
Five tetrahemihexahedra in an icosidodecahedron

Its convex hull is an icosidodecahedron. Hence it is a faceting of an icosidodecahedron, shown at left. It shares its edges and triangular faces with the compound of five octahedra.

Icosidodecahedron	Compound of five octahedra	Compound of five tetrahemihexahedra

== See also ==
- Compound of twenty tetrahemihexahedra
