= Great stellapentakis dodecahedron =

Polyhedron with 60 faces

Great stellapentakis dodecahedron
Type	Star polyhedron
Face	
Elements	F = 60, E = 90; V = 32 (χ = 2)
Symmetry group	I_{h}, [5,3], *532
Index references	DU_{55}
dual polyhedron	Truncated great icosahedron

3D model of a great stellapentakis dodecahedron

In geometry, the great stellapentakis dodecahedron (or great astropentakis dodecahedron) is a nonconvex isohedral polyhedron. It is the dual of the truncated great icosahedron. It has 60 intersecting triangular faces.

== Proportions ==
The triangles have one angle of $\arccos(-\frac{7}{36}-\frac{1}{4}\sqrt{5})\approx 138.891\,114\,686\,59^{\circ}$ and two of $\arccos(\frac{3}{4}+\frac{1}{12}\sqrt{5})\approx 20.554\,442\,656\,71^{\circ}$. The dihedral angle equals $\arccos(\frac{-80+9\sqrt{5}}{109})\approx 123.320\,065\,258\,47^{\circ}$. Part of each triangle lies within the solid, hence is invisible in solid models.
