= Medial disdyakis triacontahedron =

Polyhedron with 120 faces

Medial disdyakis triacontahedron
Type	Star polyhedron
Face	
Elements	F = 120, E = 180; V = 54 (χ = −6)
Symmetry group	I_{h}, [5,3], *532
Index references	DU_{59}
dual polyhedron	Truncated dodecadodecahedron

3D model of a medial disdyakis triacontahedron

In geometry, the medial disdyakis triacontahedron is a nonconvex isohedral polyhedron. It is the dual of the uniform truncated dodecadodecahedron. It has 120 triangular faces.

== Proportions ==
The triangles have one angle of $\arccos(-\frac{1}{10})\approx 95.739\,170\,477\,27^{\circ}$, one of $\arccos(\frac{3}{8}+\frac{11}{40}\sqrt{5})\approx 8.142\,571\,179\,89^{\circ}$ and one of $\arccos(-\frac{3}{8}+\frac{11}{40}\sqrt{5})\approx 76.118\,258\,342\,85^{\circ}$. The dihedral angle equals $\arccos(-\frac{9}{11})\approx 144.903\,198\,772\,42^{\circ}$. Part of each triangle lies within the solid, hence is invisible in solid models.
