= Great icosidodecahedron =

Polyhedron with 32 faces

Great icosidodecahedron
Type	Uniform star polyhedron
Elements	F = 32, E = 60; V = 30 (χ = 2)
Faces by sides	20{3}+12{5/2}
Coxeter diagram	
Wythoff symbol	2 | 3 5/2; 2 | 3 5/3; 2 | 3/2 5/2; 2 | 3/2 5/3
Symmetry group	I_{h}, [5,3], *532
Index references	U_{54}, C_{70}, W_{94}
Dual polyhedron	Great rhombic triacontahedron
Vertex figure	3.5/2.3.5/2
Bowers acronym	Gid

3D model of a great icosidodecahedron

In geometry, the great icosidodecahedron is a nonconvex uniform polyhedron, indexed as U_{54}. It has 32 faces (20 triangles and 12 pentagrams), 60 edges, and 30 vertices. It is given a Schläfli symbol r{3,5/2}. It is the rectification of the great stellated dodecahedron and the great icosahedron. It was discovered independently by Hess (1878), Badoureau (1881) and Pitsch (1882).

== Related polyhedra ==
The figure is a rectification of the great icosahedron or the great stellated dodecahedron, much as the (small) icosidodecahedron is related to the (small) icosahedron and (small) dodecahedron, and the cuboctahedron to the cube and octahedron.

It shares its vertex arrangement with the icosidodecahedron, which is its convex hull. Unlike the great icosahedron and great dodecahedron, the great icosidodecahedron is not a stellation of the icosidodecahedron, but a faceting of it instead.

It also shares its edge arrangement with the great icosihemidodecahedron (having the triangle faces in common), and with the great dodecahemidodecahedron (having the pentagram faces in common).

Great icosidodecahedron	Great dodecahemidodecahedron	Great icosihemidodecahedron
Icosidodecahedron (convex hull)

Animated truncation sequence from {5/2, 3} to {3, 5/2}

The truncated great stellated dodecahedron is a degenerate polyhedron, with 20 triangular faces from the truncated vertices, and 12 (hidden) pentagonal faces as truncations of the original pentagram faces, the latter forming a great dodecahedron inscribed within and sharing the edges of the icosahedron.

Name	Great stellated dodecahedron	Truncated great stellated dodecahedron	Great icosidodecahedron	Truncated great icosahedron	Great icosahedron
Coxeter diagram					
Picture					

=== Great rhombic triacontahedron ===
Great rhombic triacontahedron
Type	Star polyhedron
Face	
Elements	F = 30, E = 60; V = 32 (χ = 2)
Symmetry group	I_{h}, [5,3], *532
Index references	DU_{54}
dual polyhedron	Great icosidodecahedron

3D model of a great rhombic triacontahedron

The dual of the great icosidodecahedron is the great rhombic triacontahedron; it is nonconvex, isohedral and isotoxal. It has 30 intersecting rhombic faces. It can also be called the great stellated triacontahedron.

The great rhombic triacontahedron can be constructed by expanding the size of the faces of a rhombic triacontahedron by a factor of τ^{3} = 1+2τ = 2+√5, where τ is the golden ratio.

== See also ==
- List of uniform polyhedra
- Rhombic hexecontahedron
