= German submarine U-45 =

U-45 may refer to one of the following German submarines:

- SM U-45, was a Type U 43 submarine launched in 1915 and that served in the First World War until sunk on 12 September 1917
  - During the First World War, Germany also had these submarines with similar names:
    - SM UB-45, a Type UB II submarine launched in 1916 and sunk on 6 November 1916
    - SM UC-45, a Type UC II submarine launched in 1916 and sunk on 17 September 1917; raised on 11 April 1918; re-entered service on 24 October 1918; surrendered on 24 November 1918
- German submarine U-45 (1938), a Type VIIB submarine that served in the Second World War until sunk on 14 October 1939.

== Media ==
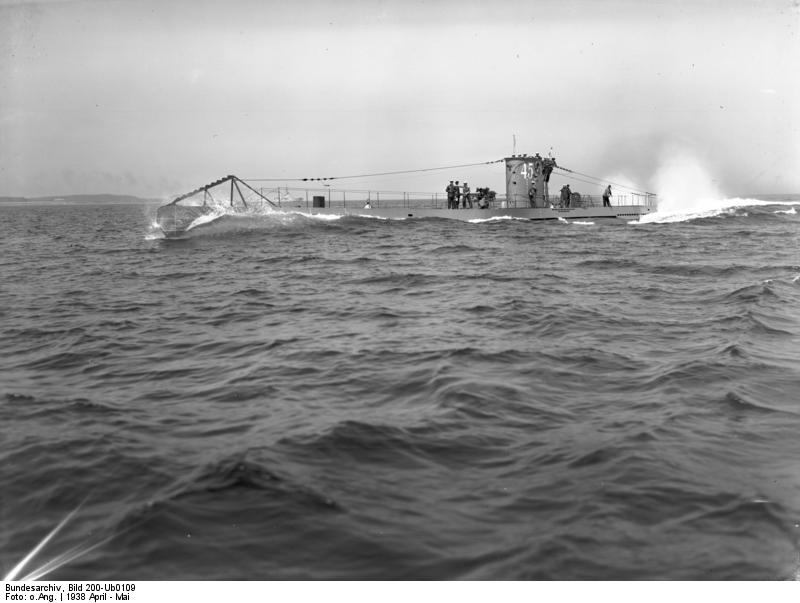
