= Great icosahedron =

Kepler–Poinsot polyhedron with 20 faces

Great icosahedron
Type	Kepler–Poinsot polyhedron
Stellation core	icosahedron
Elements	F = 20, E = 30; V = 12 (χ = 2)
Faces by sides	20{3}
Schläfli symbol	{3,5/2}
Face configuration	V(5^{3})/2
Wythoff symbol	5/2 | 2 3
Coxeter diagram	
Symmetry group	I_{h}, H_{3}, [5,3], (*532)
References	U_{53}, C_{69}, W_{41}
Properties	Regular nonconvex deltahedron
(3^{5})/2 (Vertex figure)	Great stellated dodecahedron (dual polyhedron)

3D model of a great icosahedron

In geometry, the great icosahedron is one of four Kepler–Poinsot polyhedra (nonconvex regular polyhedra), with Schläfli symbol {3,5/2} and Coxeter-Dynkin diagram of. It is composed of 20 intersecting triangular faces, having five triangles meeting at each vertex in a pentagrammic sequence.

The great icosahedron can be constructed analogously to the pentagram, its two-dimensional analogue, via the extension of the (n–1)-dimensional simplex faces of the core n-polytope (equilateral triangles for the great icosahedron, and line segments for the pentagram) until the figure regains regular faces. The grand 600-cell can be seen as its four-dimensional analogue using the same process.

== Construction ==
The edge length of a great icosahedron is $\frac{7+3\sqrt{5}}{2} = \left(\frac{1+\sqrt{5}}2\right)^4$ times that of the original icosahedron.

== Images ==
Transparent model	Density	Stellation diagram	Net
A transparent model of the great icosahedron (See also Animation)	It has a density of 7, as shown in this cross-section.	It is a stellation of the icosahedron, counted by Wenninger as model [W41] and the 16th of 17 stellations of the icosahedron and the 7th of 59 stellations by Coxeter.	× 12; Net (surface geometry); twelve isosceles pentagrammic pyramids, arranged like the faces of a dodecahedron. Each pyramid folds up like a fan: the dotted lines fold the opposite direction from the solid lines.

Spherical tiling
This polyhedron represents a spherical tiling with a density of 7. (One spherical triangle face is shown above, outlined in blue, filled in yellow)

== Formulas ==
For a great icosahedron with edge length E (the edge of its dodecahedron core),

Inradius:	$\quad E \times \frac{3\sqrt{3}-\sqrt{15}}{4}$
Midradius:	$\quad E \times \frac{\sqrt{5}-1}{4}$
Circumradius:	$\quad E \times \frac{\sqrt{2(5-\sqrt{5})}}{4}$
Surface area:	$\quad E^2 \times 3\sqrt{3}\Bigl(5+4\sqrt{5}\Bigr)$
Volume:	$\quad E^3 \times \frac{25+9\sqrt{5}}{4}$

== As a snub ==
The great icosahedron can be constructed as a uniform snub, with different colored faces and only tetrahedral symmetry:. This construction can be called a retrosnub tetrahedron or retrosnub tetratetrahedron, similar to the snub tetrahedron symmetry of the icosahedron, as a partial faceting of the truncated octahedron (or omnitruncated tetrahedron):. It can also be constructed with 2 colors of triangles and pyritohedral symmetry as, or, and is called a retrosnub octahedron.

Tetrahedral	Pyritohedral

== Related polyhedra ==
Animated truncation sequence from {5/2, 3} to {3, 5/2}

It shares the same vertex arrangement as the regular convex icosahedron. It also shares the same edge arrangement as the small stellated dodecahedron.

A truncation operation, repeatedly applied to the great icosahedron, produces a sequence of uniform polyhedra. Truncating edges down to points produces the great icosidodecahedron as a rectified great icosahedron. The process completes as a birectification, reducing the original faces down to points, and producing the great stellated dodecahedron.

The truncated great stellated dodecahedron is a degenerate polyhedron, with 20 triangular faces from the truncated vertices, and 12 (hidden) doubled up pentagonal faces ({10/2}) as truncations of the original pentagram faces, the latter forming two great dodecahedra inscribed within and sharing the edges of the icosahedron.

Name	Great stellated dodecahedron	Truncated great stellated dodecahedron	Great icosidodecahedron	Truncated great icosahedron	Great icosahedron
Coxeter-Dynkin diagram					
Picture					

Notable stellations of the icosahedron
Regular	Regular star	Uniform duals		
(Convex) icosahedron	Great icosahedron	Small triambic icosahedron	Medial triambic icosahedron	Great triambic icosahedron
Regular compounds			Others	
Compound of five octahedra	Compound of five tetrahedra	Compound of ten tetrahedra	Excavated dodecahedron	Final stellation
