= Small nucleolar RNA SNORD45 =

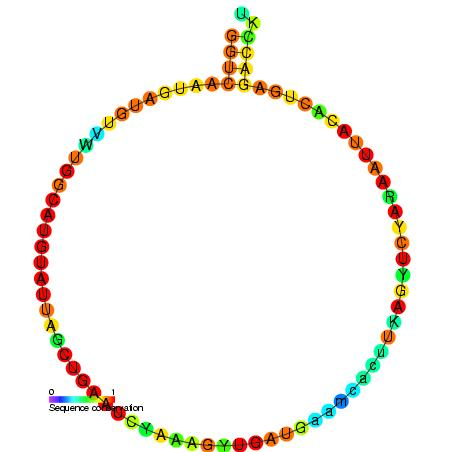
- Predicted secondary structure and sequence conservation of SNORD45

Identifiers
- Symbol: SNORD45
- Alt. Symbols: U45
- Rfam: RF00279

Other data
- RNA type: Gene; snRNA; snoRNA; C/D-box
- Domain: Eukaryota
- GO: GO:0006396 GO:0005730
- SO: SO:0000593
- PDB structures: PDBe

In molecular biology, snoRNA U45 (also known as SNORD45) is a non-coding RNA (ncRNA) molecule which functions in the modification of other small nuclear RNAs (snRNAs). This type of modifying RNA is usually located in the nucleolus of the eukaryotic cell which is a major site of snRNA biogenesis. It is known as a small nucleolar RNA (snoRNA) and also often referred to as a guide RNA.

snoRNA U45 belongs to the C/D box class of snoRNAs which contain the conserved sequence motifs known as the C box (UGAUGA) and the D box (CUGA). Most of the members of the box C/D family function in directing site-specific 2'-O-methylation of substrate RNAs.

U45 was originally cloned from HeLa cells and expression verified by northern blotting. It is related to the snoRNA (MBII-401) identified in mouse

In the human genome there are three very closely related copies of snoRNA U45 (called U45A, U45B, U45C) located within the introns of the same host gene.
