= Great icosihemidodecahedron =

Polyhedron with 26 faces

Great icosihemidodecahedron
Type	Uniform star polyhedron
Elements	F = 26, E = 60; V = 30 (χ = −4)
Faces by sides	20{3}+6{10/3}
Coxeter diagram	
Wythoff symbol	3/2 3 | 5/3
Symmetry group	I_{h}, [5,3], *532
Index references	U_{71}, C_{85}, W_{106}
Dual polyhedron	Great icosihemidodecacron
Vertex figure	3.10/3.3/2.10/3
Bowers acronym	Geihid

3D model of a great icosihemidodecahedron

In geometry, the great icosihemidodecahedron (or great icosahemidodecahedron) is a nonconvex uniform polyhedron, indexed as U_{71}. It has 26 faces (20 triangles and 6 decagrams), 60 edges, and 30 vertices. Its vertex figure is a crossed quadrilateral.

It is a hemipolyhedron with 6 decagrammic faces passing through the model center.

== Related polyhedra ==
Its convex hull is the icosidodecahedron. It also shares its edge arrangement with the great icosidodecahedron (having the triangular faces in common), and with the great dodecahemidodecahedron (having the decagrammic faces in common).

Great icosidodecahedron	Great dodecahemidodecahedron	Great icosihemidodecahedron
Icosidodecahedron (convex hull)

== Gallery ==
Traditional filling	Modulo-2 filling

== See also ==
- List of uniform polyhedra
