= Icositruncated dodecadodecahedron =

Polyhedron with 44 faces

Icositruncated dodecadodecahedron
Type	Uniform star polyhedron
Elements	F = 44, E = 180; V = 120 (χ = −16)
Faces by sides	20{6}+12{10}+12{10/3}
Coxeter diagram	
Wythoff symbol	3 5 5/3 |
Symmetry group	I_{h}, [5,3], *532
Index references	U_{45}, C_{57}, W_{84}
Dual polyhedron	Tridyakis icosahedron
Vertex figure	6.10.10/3
Bowers acronym	Idtid

3D model of an icositruncated dodecadodecahedron

In geometry, the icositruncated dodecadodecahedron or icosidodecatruncated icosidodecahedron is a nonconvex uniform polyhedron, indexed as U_{45}.

== Convex hull ==
Its convex hull is a nonuniform truncated icosidodecahedron.

Truncated icosidodecahedron	Convex hull	Icositruncated dodecadodecahedron

== Cartesian coordinates ==
Cartesian coordinates for the vertices of an icositruncated dodecadodecahedron are all the even permutations of $\begin{array}{crrlc} \Bigl(& \pm\bigl[2-\frac{1}{\varphi}\bigr],& \pm\,1,& \pm\bigl[2+\varphi\bigr] &\Bigr), \\ \Bigl(& \pm\,1,& \pm\,\frac{1}{\varphi^2},& \pm\bigl[3\varphi-1\bigr] &\Bigr), \\ \Bigl(& \pm\,2,& \pm\,\frac{2}{\varphi},& \pm\,2\varphi &\Bigr), \\ \Bigl(& \pm\,3,& \pm\,\frac{1}{\varphi^2},& \pm\,\varphi^2 &\Bigr), \\ \Bigl(& \pm\,\varphi^2,& \pm\,1,& \pm\bigl[3\varphi-2\bigr] &\Bigr), \end{array}$

where $\varphi = \tfrac{1+\sqrt 5}{2}$ is the golden ratio.

== Related polyhedra ==
=== Tridyakis icosahedron ===
Tridyakis icosahedron
Type	Star polyhedron
Face	
Elements	F = 120, E = 180; V = 44 (χ = −16)
Symmetry group	I_{h}, [5,3], *532
Index references	DU_{45}
dual polyhedron	Icositruncated dodecadodecahedron

The tridyakis icosahedron is the dual polyhedron of the icositruncated dodecadodecahedron. It has 44 vertices, 180 edges, and 120 scalene triangular faces.

== See also ==
- Catalan solid Duals to convex uniform polyhedra
- Uniform polyhedra
- List of uniform polyhedra
