= Truncated dodecadodecahedron =

Polyhedron with 54 faces

Truncated dodecadodecahedron
Type	Uniform star polyhedron
Elements	F = 54, E = 180; V = 120 (χ = −6)
Faces by sides	30{4}+12{10}+12{10/3}
Coxeter diagram	
Wythoff symbol	2 5 5/3 |
Symmetry group	I_{h}, [5,3], *532
Index references	U_{59}, C_{75}, W_{98}
Dual polyhedron	Medial disdyakis triacontahedron
Vertex figure	4.10/9.10/3
Bowers acronym	Quitdid

3D model of a truncated dodecadodecahedron

In geometry, the truncated dodecadodecahedron (or stellatruncated dodecadodecahedron) is a nonconvex uniform polyhedron, indexed as U_{59}. It is given a Schläfli symbol t_{0,1,2}{5/3,5}. It has 54 faces (30 squares, 12 decagons, and 12 decagrams), 180 edges, and 120 vertices. The central region of the polyhedron is connected to the exterior via 20 small triangular holes.

The name truncated dodecadodecahedron is somewhat misleading: truncation of the dodecadodecahedron would produce rectangular faces rather than squares, and the pentagram faces of the dodecadodecahedron would turn into truncated pentagrams rather than decagrams. However, it is the quasitruncation of the dodecadodecahedron, as defined by Coxeter, Longuet-Higgins & Miller (1954). For this reason, it is also known as the quasitruncated dodecadodecahedron. Coxeter et al. credit its discovery to a paper published in 1881 by Austrian mathematician Johann Pitsch.

== Cartesian coordinates ==
Cartesian coordinates for the vertices of a truncated dodecadodecahedron are all the triples of numbers obtained by circular shifts and sign changes from the following points (where $\varphi = \tfrac{1 + \sqrt{5}}{2}$ is the golden ratio): $\begin{array}{lcr} \Bigl(1,& 1,& 3\Bigr), \\ \Bigl(\frac{1}{\varphi},& \frac{1}{\varphi^2},& 2\varphi\Bigr), \\ \Bigl(\varphi,& \frac{2}{\varphi},& \varphi^2\Bigr), \\ \Bigl(\varphi^2,& \frac{1}{\varphi^2},& 2\Bigr), \\ \Bigl(\sqrt{5},& 1,& \sqrt{5}\Bigr). \end{array}$

Each of these five points has eight possible sign patterns and three possible circular shifts, giving a total of 120 different points.

== As a Cayley graph ==
The truncated dodecadodecahedron forms a Cayley graph for the symmetric group on five elements, as generated by two group members: one that swaps the first two elements of a five-tuple, and one that performs a circular shift operation on the last four elements. That is, the 120 vertices of the polyhedron may be placed in one-to-one correspondence with the 5! permutations on five elements, in such a way that the three neighbors of each vertex are the three permutations formed from it by swapping the first two elements or circularly shifting (in either direction) the last four elements.

== Related polyhedra ==
=== Medial disdyakis triacontahedron ===
Medial disdyakis triacontahedron
Type	Star polyhedron
Face	
Elements	F = 120, E = 180; V = 54 (χ = −6)
Symmetry group	I_{h}, [5,3], *532
Index references	DU_{59}
dual polyhedron	Truncated dodecadodecahedron

3D model of a medial disdyakis triacontahedron

The medial disdyakis triacontahedron is a nonconvex isohedral polyhedron. It is the dual of the uniform truncated dodecadodecahedron.

== See also ==
- List of uniform polyhedra
