= Icosidodecahedron =

Archimedean solid with 32 faces

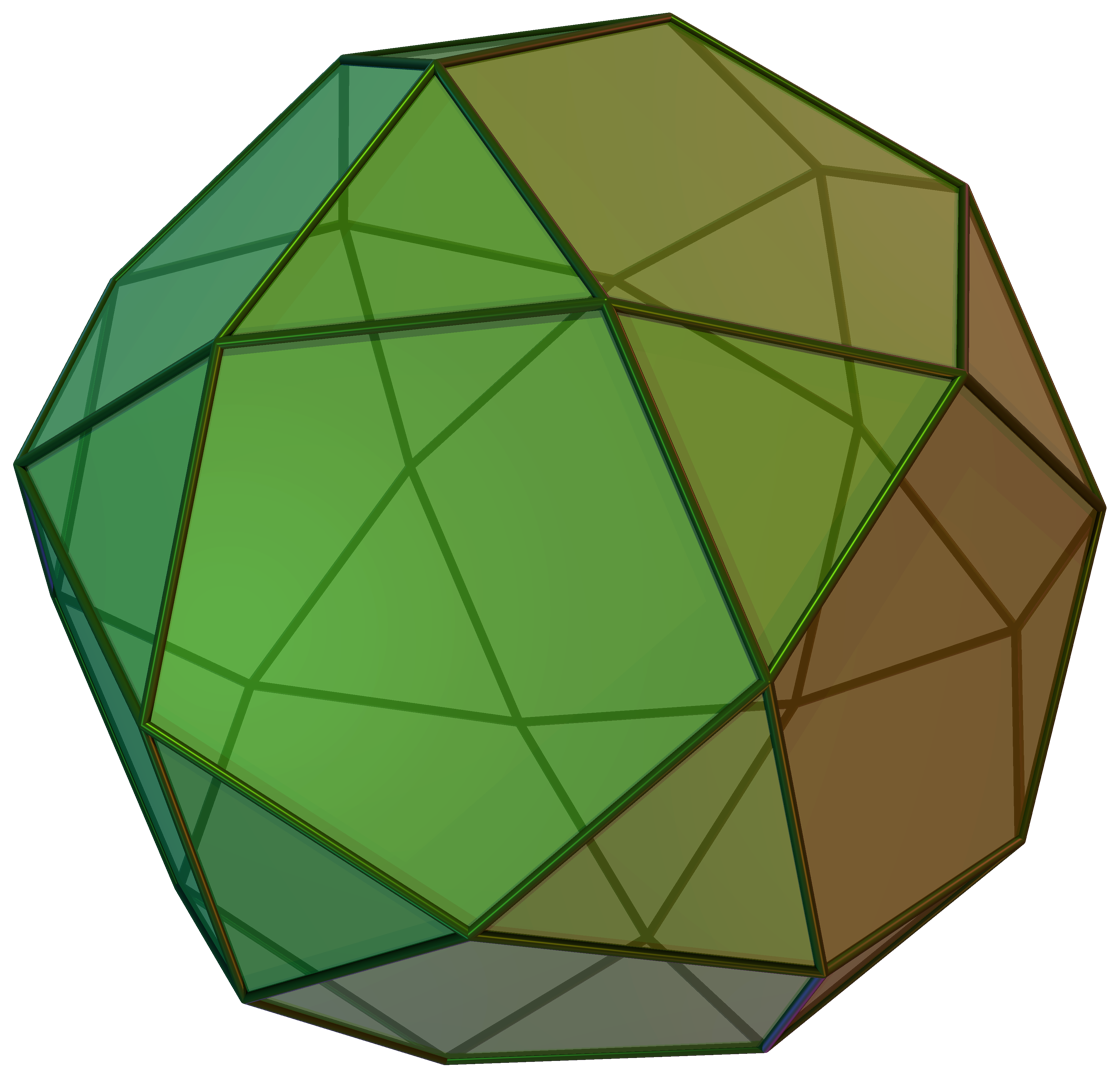
- Type: Archimedean solid Uniform polyhedron Quasiregular polyhedron
- Faces: 32
- Edges: 60
- Vertices: 30
- Symmetry group: Icosahedral symmetry I_{h}
- Dihedral angle (degrees): 142.62°
- Dual polyhedron: Rhombic triacontahedron
- Properties: convex

Vertex figure

Net

3D model of an icosidodecahedron

In geometry, an icosidodecahedron or pentagonal gyrobirotunda is a polyhedron with twenty (icosi-) triangular faces and twelve (dodeca-) pentagonal faces. An icosidodecahedron has 30 identical vertices, with two triangles and two pentagons meeting at each, and 60 identical edges, each separating a triangle from a pentagon. As such, it is one of the Archimedean solids and more particularly, a quasiregular polyhedron.

== Construction ==
One way to construct the icosidodecahedron is to start with two pentagonal rotunda by attaching them to their bases. These rotundas cover their decagonal base so that the resulting polyhedron has 32 faces, 30 vertices, and 60 edges. This construction is similar to one of the Johnson solids, the pentagonal orthobirotunda. The difference is that the icosidodecahedron is constructed by twisting its rotundas by 36°, a process known as gyration, resulting in the pentagonal face connecting to the triangular one. The icosidodecahedron has an alternative name, pentagonal gyrobirotunda.

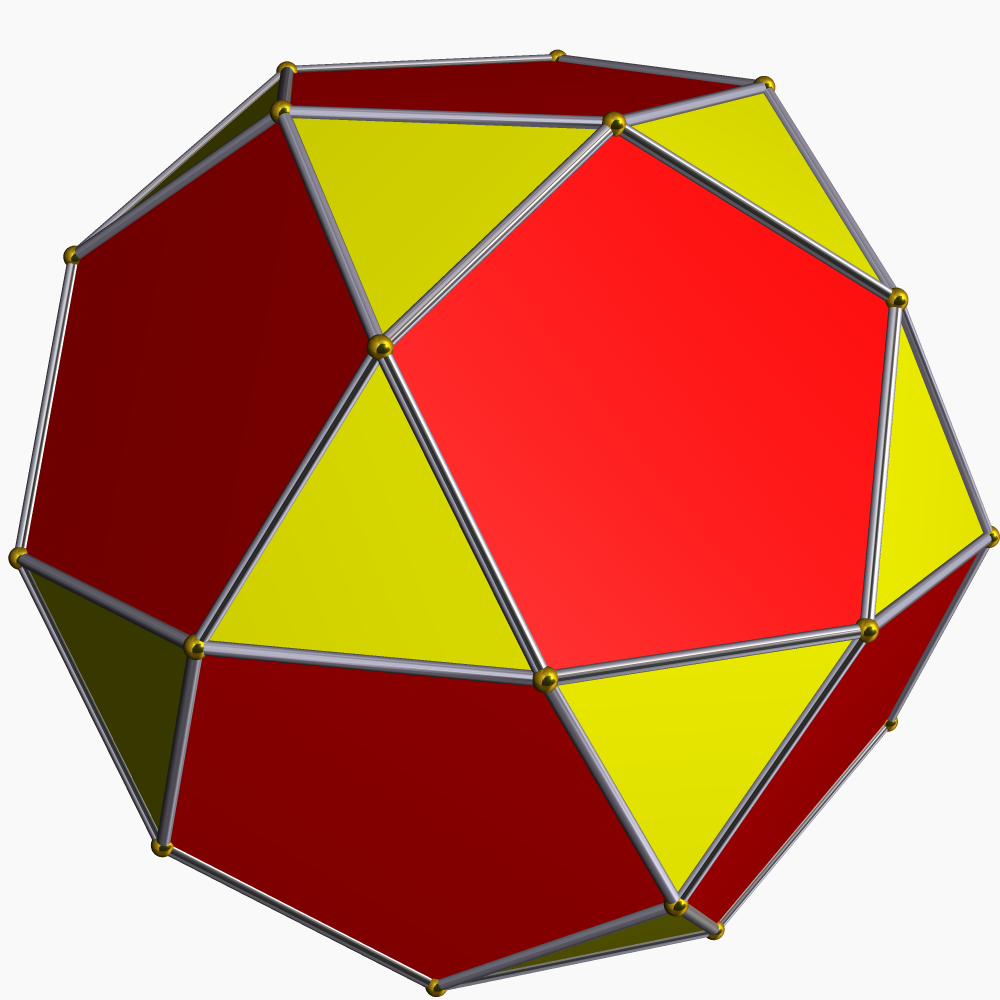
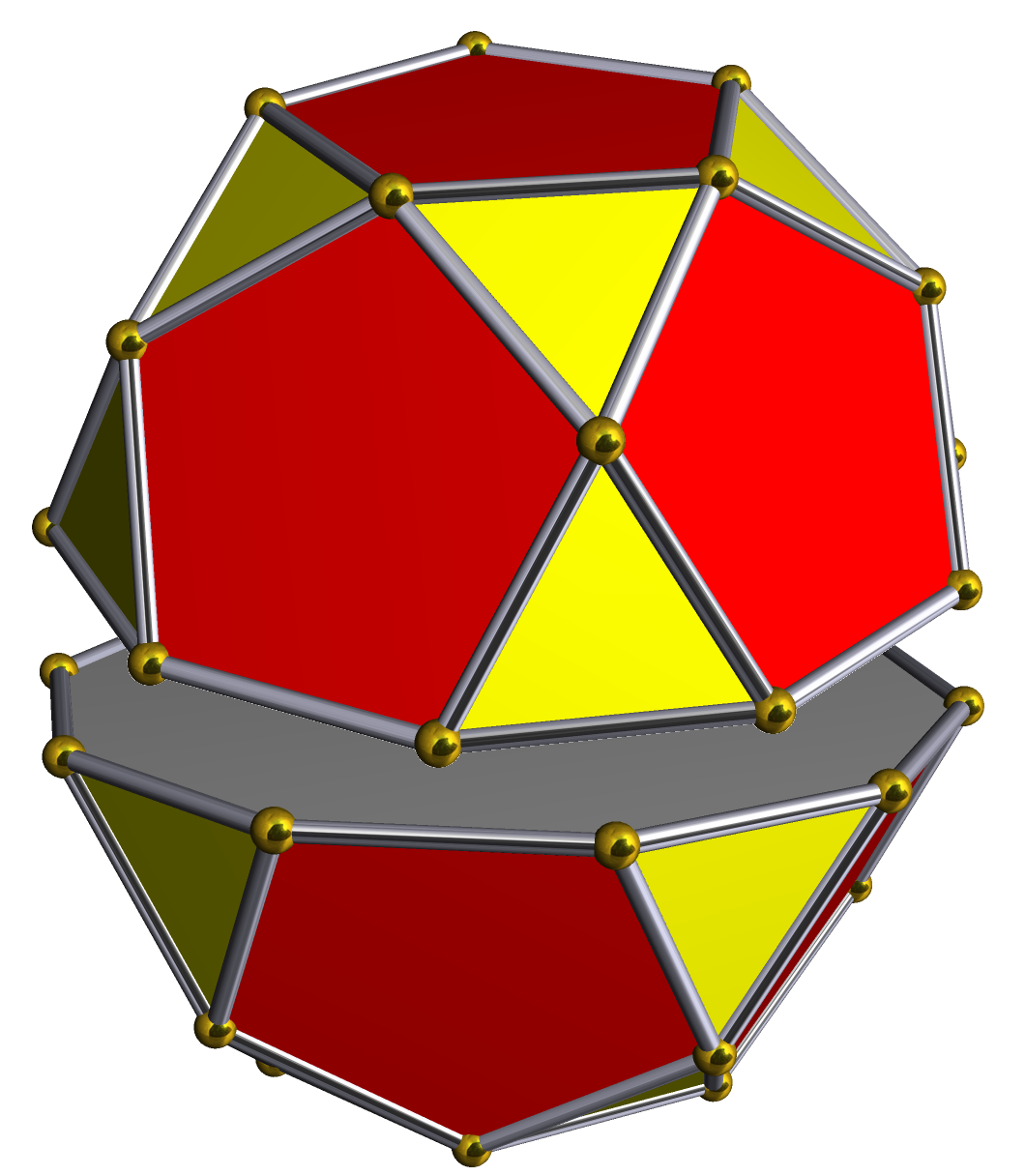
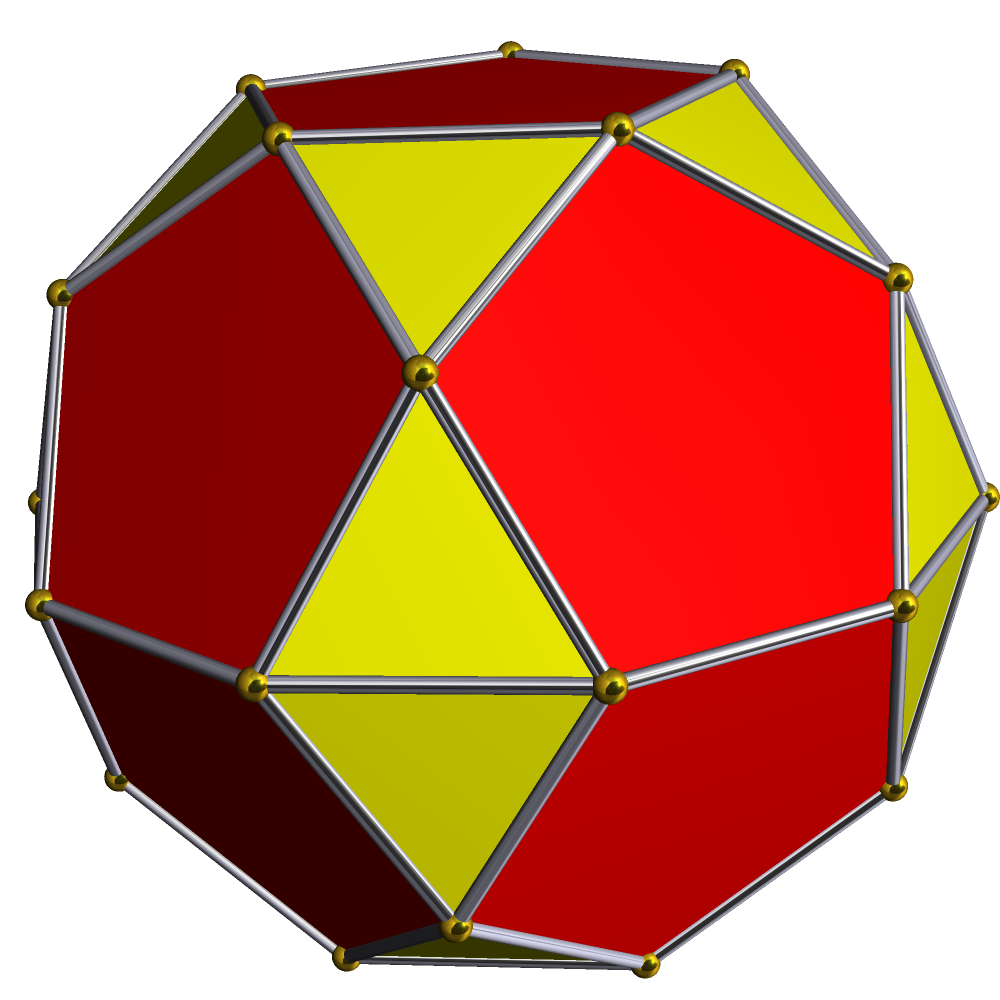
The difference between icosidodecahedron and pentagonal orthobirotunda, and its dissection.

There is another way to construct it, and that is rectification of an icosahedron or a dodecahedron.

Convenient Cartesian coordinates for the vertices of an icosidodecahedron with unit radius are given by the even permutations of:
$$(\pm 1, 0, 0), \qquad \tfrac{1}{2}\left(\pm \varphi, \pm \tfrac{1}{\varphi}, \pm 1 \right),$$

with the equivalents with unit edges are given by the even permutations of:
$$(0, 0, \pm \varphi), \qquad \left(\pm \frac{1}{2}, \pm \frac{\varphi}{2}, \pm \frac{\varphi^2}{2} \right),$$

where $\varphi$ denotes the golden ratio.

== Properties ==
The surface area of an icosidodecahedron A can be determined by calculating the area of all pentagonal faces. The volume of an icosidodecahedron V can be determined by slicing it off into two pentagonal rotunda, after which summing up their volumes. Therefore, its surface area and volume can be formulated as:
$$\begin{align}
A &= \left(5\sqrt{3}+3\sqrt{25+10\sqrt{5}}\right) a^2 &\approx 29.306a^2 \\
V &= \frac{45+17\sqrt{5}}{6}a^3 &\approx 13.836a^3.
\end{align}$$

The dihedral angle of an icosidodecahedron between pentagon-to-triangle is
$$\arccos \left(-\sqrt{\frac{5 + 2\sqrt{5}}{15}} \right) \approx 142.62^\circ,$$
determined by calculating the angle of a pentagonal rotunda.

An icosidodecahedron has icosahedral symmetry, and its first stellation is the compound of a dodecahedron and its dual icosahedron, with the vertices of the icosidodecahedron located at the midpoints of the edges of either.

The icosidodecahedron is an Archimedean solid, meaning it is a highly symmetric and semi-regular polyhedron, and two or more different regular polygonal faces meet in a vertex. The polygonal faces that meet for every vertex are two equilateral triangles and two regular pentagons, and the vertex figure of an icosidodecahedron is $(3 \cdot 5)^2 = 3^2 \cdot 5^2$. Its dual polyhedron is rhombic triacontahedron, a Catalan solid.

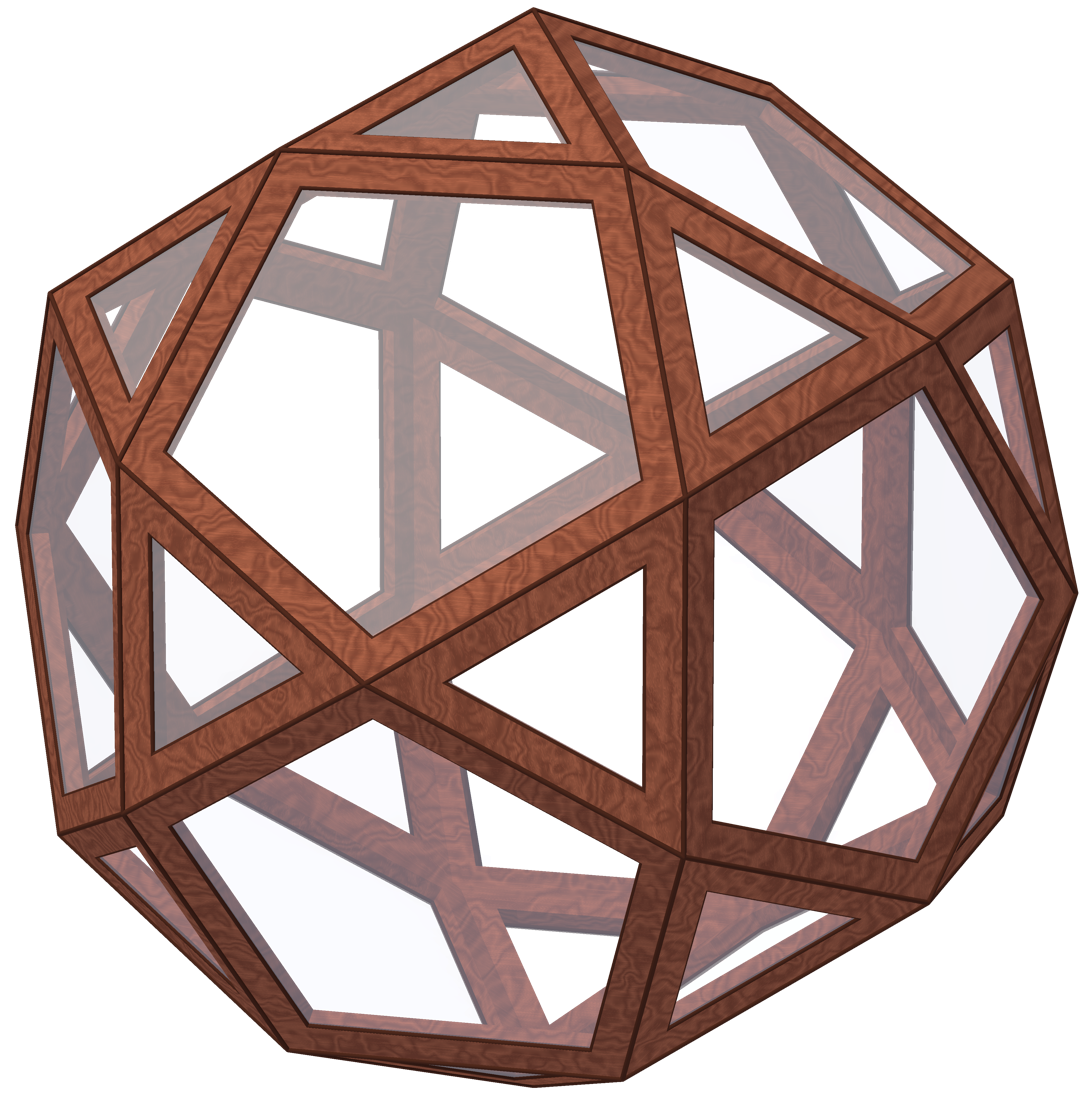
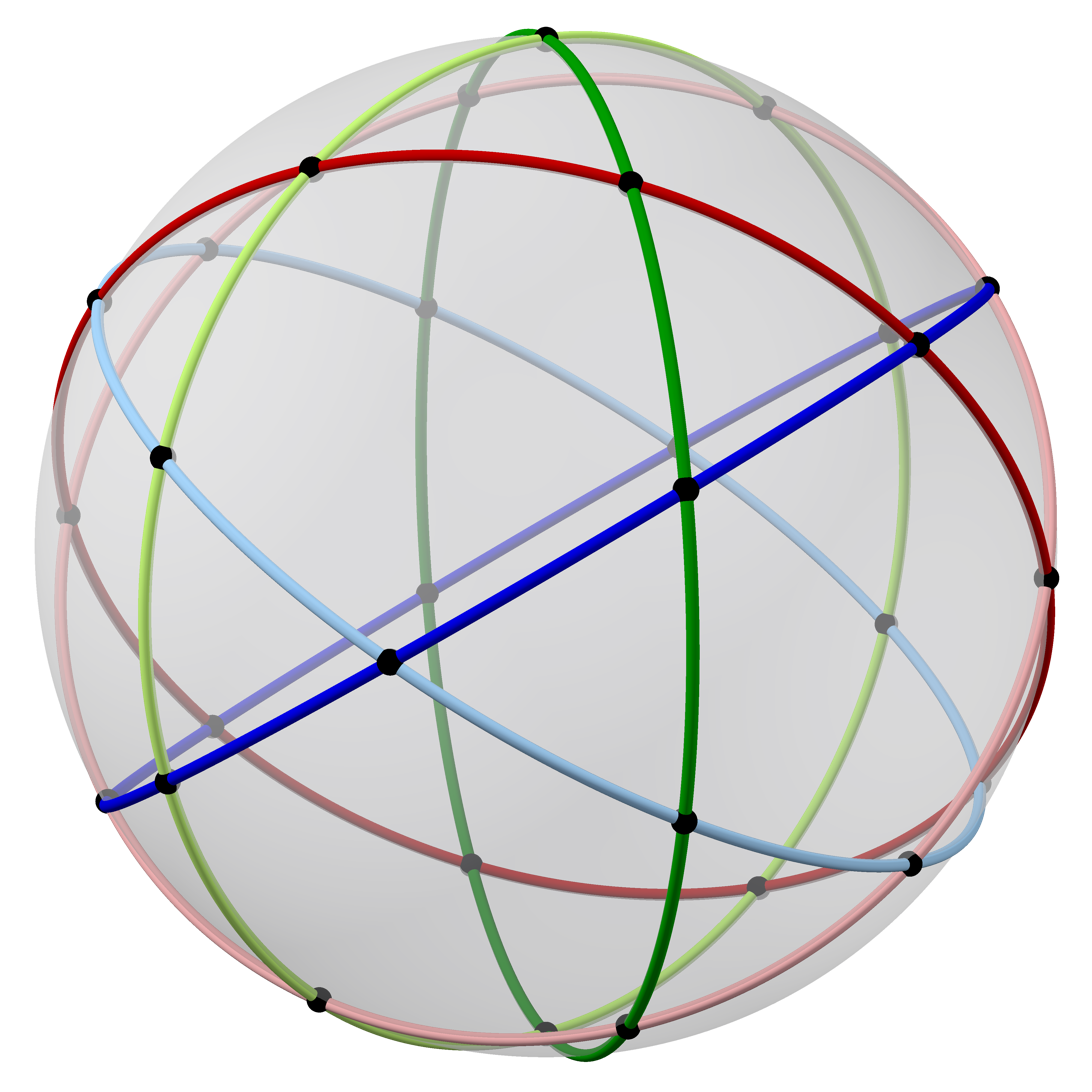
The 60 edges form 6 decagons corresponding to great circles in the spherical tiling.

The icosidodecahedron has 6 central decagons. Projected into a sphere, they define 6 great circles. Fuller (1975) used these 6 great circles, along with 15 and 10 others in two other polyhedra to define his 31 great circles of the spherical icosahedron.

The long radius (center to vertex) of the icosidodecahedron is in the golden ratio to its edge length; thus its radius is φ if its edge length is 1, and its edge length is 1/φ if its radius is 1. Only a few uniform polytopes have this property, including the four-dimensional 600-cell, the three-dimensional icosidodecahedron, and the two-dimensional decagon. (The icosidodecahedron is the equatorial cross-section of the 600-cell, and the decagon is the equatorial cross-section of the icosidodecahedron.) These radially golden polytopes can be constructed, with their radii, from golden triangles which meet at the center, each contributing two radii and an edge.

== Related polytopes ==
The icosidodecahedron is a rectified dodecahedron and also a rectified icosahedron, existing as the full-edge truncation between these regular solids.

The icosidodecahedron contains 12 pentagons of the dodecahedron and 20 triangles of the icosahedron:

Family of uniform icosahedral polyhedra
| Symmetry: [5,3], (*532) | | | | | | | [5,3]^{+}, (532) |
|---|---|---|---|---|---|---|---|
| {5,3} | t{5,3} | r{5,3} | t{3,5} | {3,5} | rr{5,3} | tr{5,3} | sr{5,3} |
Duals to uniform polyhedra
| V5.5.5 | V3.10.10 | V3.5.3.5 | V5.6.6 | V3.3.3.3.3 | V3.4.5.4 | V4.6.10 | V3.3.3.3.5 |

The icosidodecahedron exists in a sequence of symmetries of quasiregular polyhedra and tilings with vertex configurations (3.n)^{2}, progressing from tilings of the sphere to the Euclidean plane and into the hyperbolic plane. With orbifold notation symmetry of *n32 all of these tilings are wythoff construction within a fundamental domain of symmetry, with generator points at the right angle corner of the domain.

*n32 orbifold symmetries of quasiregular tilings: (3.n)^{2}
| Construction | Spherical | | | Euclidean | Hyperbolic | | |
| Construction | *332 | *432 | *532 | *632 | *732 | *832... | *∞32 |
|---|---|---|---|---|---|---|---|
| Quasiregular figures | | | | | | | |
| Vertex | (3.3)^{2} | (3.4)^{2} | (3.5)^{2} | (3.6)^{2} | (3.7)^{2} | (3.8)^{2} | (3.∞)^{2} |

*5n2 symmetry mutations of quasiregular tilings: (5.n)^{2}
| Symmetry *5n2 [n,5] | Spherical | Hyperbolic | | | | | Paracompact | Noncompact |
| Symmetry *5n2 [n,5] | *352 [3,5] | *452 [4,5] | *552 [5,5] | *652 [6,5] | *752 [7,5] | *852 [8,5]... | *∞52 [∞,5] | [ni,5] |
|---|---|---|---|---|---|---|---|---|
| Figures | | | | | | | | |
| Config. | (5.3)^{2} | (5.4)^{2} | (5.5)^{2} | (5.6)^{2} | (5.7)^{2} | (5.8)^{2} | (5.∞)^{2} | (5.ni)^{2} |
| Rhombic figures | | | | | | | | |
| Config. | V(5.3)^{2} | V(5.4)^{2} | V(5.5)^{2} | V(5.6)^{2} | V(5.7)^{2} | V(5.8)^{2} | V(5.∞)^{2} | V(5.∞)^{2} |

=== Related polyhedra ===
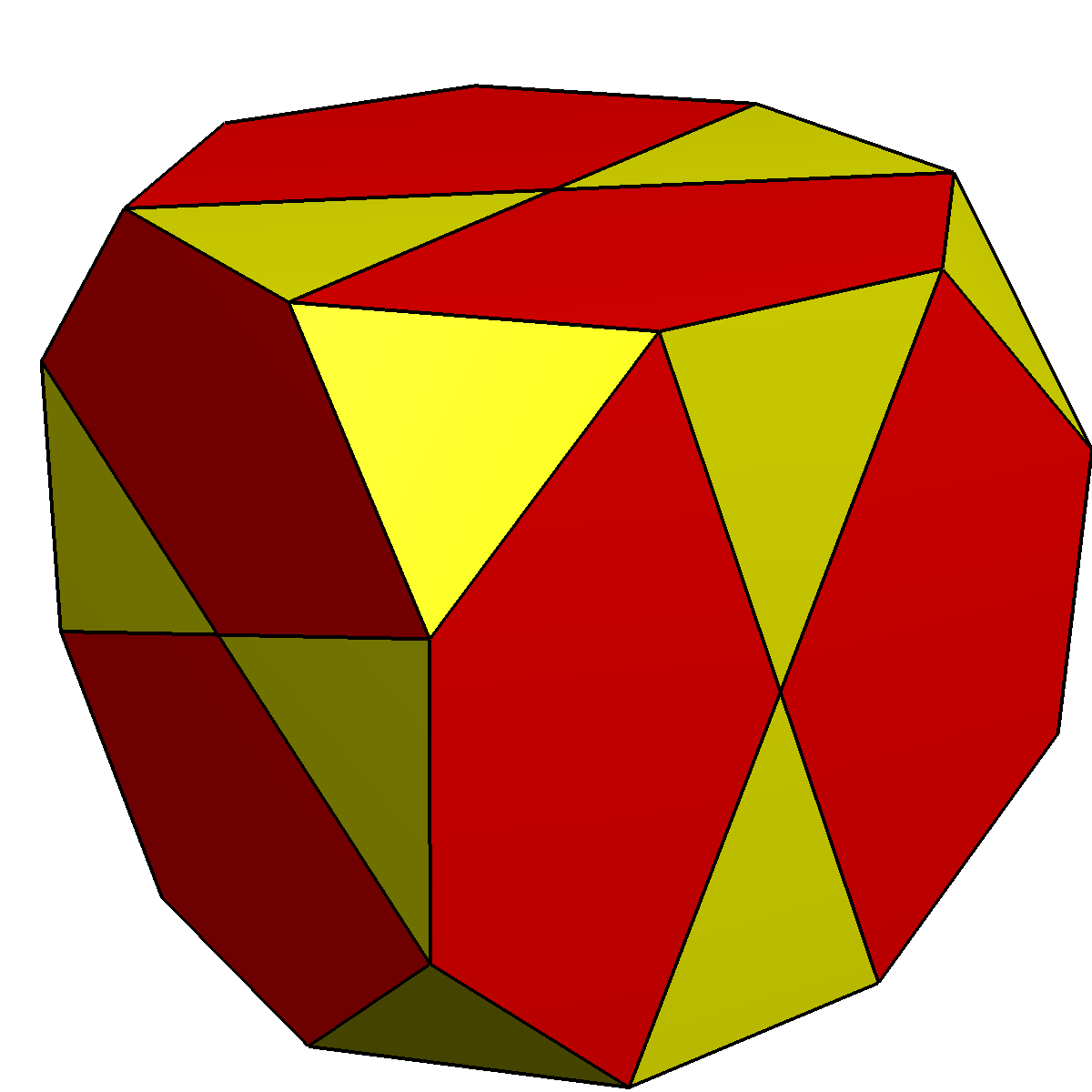
A topological icosidodecahedron in truncated cube, inserting 6 vertices in center of octagons, and dissecting them into 2 pentagons and 2 triangles.

The truncated cube can be turned into an icosidodecahedron by dividing the octagons into two pentagons and two triangles. It has pyritohedral symmetry.

Eight uniform star polyhedra share the same vertex arrangement. Of these, two also share the same edge arrangement: the small icosihemidodecahedron (having the triangular faces in common), and the small dodecahemidodecahedron (having the pentagonal faces in common). The vertex arrangement is also shared with the compounds of five octahedra and of five tetrahemihexahedra.

| Icosidodecahedron | Small icosihemidodecahedron | Small dodecahemidodecahedron |
| Great icosidodecahedron | Great dodecahemidodecahedron | Great icosihemidodecahedron |
| Dodecadodecahedron | Small dodecahemicosahedron | Great dodecahemicosahedron |
| Compound of five octahedra | Compound of five tetrahemihexahedra | |

=== Related polychora ===
In four-dimensional geometry, the icosidodecahedron appears in the regular 600-cell as the equatorial slice that belongs to the vertex-first passage of the 600-cell through 3D space. In other words: the 30 vertices of the 600-cell which lie at arc distances of 90 degrees on its circumscribed hypersphere from a pair of opposite vertices, are the vertices of an icosidodecahedron. The wireframe figure of the 600-cell consists of 72 flat regular decagons. Six of these are the equatorial decagons to a pair of opposite vertices, and these six form the wireframe figure of an icosidodecahedron.

If a 600-cell is stereographically projected to 3-space about any vertex and all points are normalised, the geodesics upon which edges fall comprise the icosidodecahedron's barycentric subdivision.

== Graph ==
| Icosidodecahedral graph | Hemi-icosidodecahedral graph |
|---|---|
| | Perimeter opposite edges and vertices glued |

The skeleton of an icosidodecahedron can be represented as the symmetric graph with 30 vertices and 60 edges, one of the Archimedean graphs. It is a symmetric quartic graph, meaning that each vertex is connected to four other vertices.

The related hemi-icosidodecahederal graph exists in the real projective plane, with 15 vertices and 30 edges. It is also a symmetric quartic graph. It can be drawn inside of a regular decagon perimeter, with opposite vertices and edges glued together.

== Applications ==
Animation of a Hoberman sphere in the form of a spherical icosidodecahedron with each of its six geodesics distinctly coloured, the grey ring viewed face on and the far hemisphere muted

The icosidodecahedron may appear in structures, as in the geodesic dome or the Hoberman sphere.

Icosidodecahedra can be found in all eukaryotic cells, including human cells, as Sec13/31 COPII coat-protein formations.

The icosidodecahedron may also found in popular culture. In Star Trek universe, the Vulcan game of logic Kal-Toh has the goal of creating a shape with two nested holographic icosidodecahedra joined at the midpoints of their segments.

== See also ==
- Cuboctahedron
- Great truncated icosidodecahedron
- Icosahedron
- Rhombicosidodecahedron
- Truncated icosidodecahedron
