= Great stellated dodecahedron =

Kepler–Poinsot polyhedron

Great stellated dodecahedron
Type	Kepler–Poinsot polyhedron
Stellation core	regular dodecahedron
Elements	F = 12, E = 30; V = 20 (χ = 2)
Faces by sides	12 { 5/2 }
Schläfli symbol	{5/2,3}
Face configuration	V(3^{5})/2
Wythoff symbol	3 | 2 5/2
Coxeter diagram	
Symmetry group	I_{h}, H_{3}, [5,3], (*532)
References	U_{52}, C_{68}, W_{22}
Properties	Regular nonconvex
(5/2)^{3} (Vertex figure)	Great icosahedron (dual polyhedron)

3D model of a great stellated dodecahedron

In geometry, the great stellated dodecahedron is a Kepler–Poinsot polyhedron, with Schläfli symbol {5/2, 3}. It is one of four nonconvex regular polyhedra.

It is composed of 12 intersecting pentagrammic faces, with three pentagrams meeting at each vertex.

It shares its vertex arrangement, although not its vertex figure or vertex configuration, with the regular dodecahedron, as well as being a stellation of a (smaller) dodecahedron. It is the only dodecahedral stellation with this property, apart from the dodecahedron itself. Its dual, the great icosahedron, is related in a similar fashion to the icosahedron.

It can be constructed by augmenting each face of a regular icosahedron with a right triangular pyramid of height $\sqrt{\frac{7+3\sqrt5}{6}}$ times the icosahedron's edge length.

If the pentagrammic faces are broken into triangles, it is topologically related to the triakis icosahedron, with the same face connectivity, but much taller isosceles triangle faces. If the triangles are instead made to invert themselves and excavate the central icosahedron, the result is a great dodecahedron.

The great stellated dodecahedron can be constructed analogously to the pentagram, its two-dimensional analogue, by attempting to stellate the n-dimensional pentagonal polytope (which has pentagonal polytope faces and simplex vertex figures) until it can no longer be stellated; that is, it is its final stellation.

== Images ==
Transparent model	Tiling
Transparent great stellated dodecahedron (Animation)	This polyhedron can be made as spherical tiling with a density of 7. (One spherical pentagram face is shown above, outlined in blue, filled in yellow)
Net	Stellation facets
× 20; A net of a great stellated dodecahedron (surface geometry); twenty isosceles triangular pyramids, arranged like the faces of an icosahedron.	It can be constructed as the third of three stellations of the dodecahedron, and referenced as Wenninger model [W22].
Complete net of a great stellated dodecahedron.

== Formulas ==
For a great stellated dodecahedron with edge length E (where E represents the length of any edge of the internal icosahedron),

Inradius:	$\quad E \times \frac{\sqrt{5}-1}{2}$
Midradius:	$\quad E \times \frac{1+\sqrt{5}}{4}$
Circumradius:	$\quad E \times \frac{\sqrt{3}(3+\sqrt{5})}{4}$
Surface area:	$\quad E^2 \times 15\sqrt{5+2\sqrt{5}}$
Volume:	$\quad E^3 \times \frac{5(3+\sqrt{5})}{4}$

== Related polyhedra ==
Animated truncation sequence from {5/2, 3} to {3, 5/2}

A truncation process applied to the great stellated dodecahedron produces a series of uniform polyhedra. Truncating edges down to points produces the great icosidodecahedron as a rectified great stellated dodecahedron. The process completes as a birectification, reducing the original faces down to points, and producing the great icosahedron.

The truncated great stellated dodecahedron is a degenerate polyhedron, with 20 triangular faces from the truncated vertices, and 12 (hidden) pentagonal faces as truncations of the original pentagram faces, the latter forming a great dodecahedron inscribed within and sharing the edges of the icosahedron.

Stellations of the dodecahedron
Platonic solid	Kepler–Poinsot solids		
Dodecahedron	Small stellated dodecahedron	Great dodecahedron	Great stellated dodecahedron

Name	Great stellated dodecahedron	Truncated great stellated dodecahedron	Great icosidodecahedron	Truncated great icosahedron	Great icosahedron
Coxeter-Dynkin diagram					
Picture					

== Research applications ==
The great stellated dodecahedron is among the nonconvex polyhedra examined in computational studies of dense particle packing. A periodic packing with two polyhedra per unit cell and a packing fraction of approximately 0.88967 was identified, providing a lower bound on the maximum packing density.

In 2020, researchers reported the electrochemical synthesis of gold nanocrystals with a great-stellated-dodecahedral morphology, bounded by high-index {331} crystal facets. The nanocrystals were investigated as electrocatalysts for nitrogen reduction to ammonia under ambient conditions, with a reported Faradaic efficiency of 28.59%.

The great stellated dodecahedron has also been studied in mathematics as an alternative spatial embedding of the graph of a regular dodecahedron. Coolsaet and Schein identified the great stellated dodecahedron as an algebraic conjugate of the regular dodecahedron: substituting the conjugate of the golden ratio in its vertex coordinates produces an embedding of the same graph with equal edge lengths and planar faces.
