= Dual uniform polyhedron =

A dual uniform polyhedron is the dual of a uniform polyhedron. Where a uniform polyhedron is vertex-transitive, a dual uniform polyhedron is face-transitive.

== Enumeration ==
The face-transitive polyhedra comprise a set of 9 regular polyhedra, two finite sets comprising 66 non-regular polyhedra, and two infinite sets:

- 5 regular convex Platonic solids: regular tetrahedron, cube, regular octahedron, regular dodecahedron, and regular icosahedron. The regular octahedron is dual to the cube, and the regular icosahedron is dual to the regular dodecahedron. The regular tetrahedron is self-dual, meaning its dual is the regular tetrahedron itself.
- 4 regular star Kepler–Poinsot solids: great dodecahedron, small stellated dodecahedron, great icosahedron, and great stellated dodecahedron. The great dodecahedron is dual to the small stellated dodecahedron, and the great icosahedron is dual to the great stellated dodecahedron.
- 13 convex Catalan solids, which are dual to the uniform convex Archimedean solids.
- 53 star polyhedra, which are dual to the uniform star polyhedra.
- The infinite series of bipyramids, which are dual to the uniform prisms, both convex and star.
- The infinite series of trapezohedra, which are dual to the uniform antiprisms, both convex and star.

The full set are described by Wenninger, together with instructions for constructing models, in his book Dual Models.

== Dorman Luke construction ==
The illustration here shows the vertex figure (red) of the cuboctahedron being used to derive the corresponding face (blue) of the rhombic dodecahedron.

For a uniform polyhedron, each face of the dual polyhedron may be derived from the original polyhedron's corresponding vertex figure by using the Dorman Luke construction. Dorman Luke's construction proceeds as follows:

1. Mark the points A, B, C, D of each edge connected to the vertex V (in this case, the midpoints) such that VA = VB = VC = VD.
2. Draw the vertex figure ABCD.
3. Draw the circumcircle of ABCD.
4. Draw the line tangent to the circumcircle at each corner A, B, C, D.
5. Mark the points E, F, G, H, where each two adjacent tangent lines meet.

The line segments EF, FG, GH, HE are already drawn, as parts of the tangent lines. The polygon EFGH is the face of the dual polyhedron that corresponds to the original vertex V.

In this example, the size of the vertex figure was chosen so that its circumcircle lies on the intersphere of the cuboctahedron, which also becomes the intersphere of the dual rhombic dodecahedron. Dorman Luke's construction can only be used when a polyhedron has such an intersphere so that the vertex figure has a circumcircle. For instance, it can be applied to the uniform polyhedra.

== See also ==
- List of uniform polyhedra
