= Decagram =

Decagram may refer to:

- 10 gram, or 0.01 kilogram, a unit of mass, in SI referred to as a dag
- Decagram (geometry), geometric figure
