= Great rhombic triacontahedron =

Polyhedron with 30 faces

Great rhombic triacontahedron
Type	Star polyhedron
Face	
Elements	F = 30, E = 60; V = 32 (χ = 2)
Symmetry group	I_{h}, [5,3], *532
Index references	DU_{54}
dual polyhedron	Great icosidodecahedron

3D model of a great rhombic triacontahedron

In geometry, the great rhombic triacontahedron is a nonconvex isohedral, isotoxal polyhedron. It is the dual of the great icosidodecahedron (U54). Like the convex rhombic triacontahedron it has 30 rhombic faces, 60 edges and 32 vertices (also 20 on 3-fold and 12 on 5-fold axes).

It can be constructed from the convex solid by expanding the faces by factor of $\varphi^3 \approx 4.236$, where $\varphi\!$ is the golden ratio.

This solid is to the compound of great icosahedron and great stellated dodecahedron what the convex one is to the compound of dodecahedron and icosahedron: The crossing edges in the dual compound are the diagonals of the rhombs.

What resembles an "excavated" rhombic triacontahedron (compare excavated dodecahedron and excavated icosahedron) can be seen within the middle of this compound. The rest of the polyhedron strikingly resembles a rhombic hexecontahedron.

The rhombs have two angles of $\arccos(\frac{1}{5}\sqrt{5})\approx 63.434\,948\,822\,92^{\circ}$, and two of $\arccos(-\frac{1}{5}\sqrt{5})\approx 116.565\,051\,177\,08^{\circ}$. Its dihedral angles equal $\arccos(-\frac{1}{4}+\frac{1}{4}\sqrt{5})= 72^{\circ}$. Part of each rhomb lies inside the solid, hence is invisible in solid models. The ratio between the lengths of the long and short diagonal of the rhombs equals the golden ratio $\varphi$.

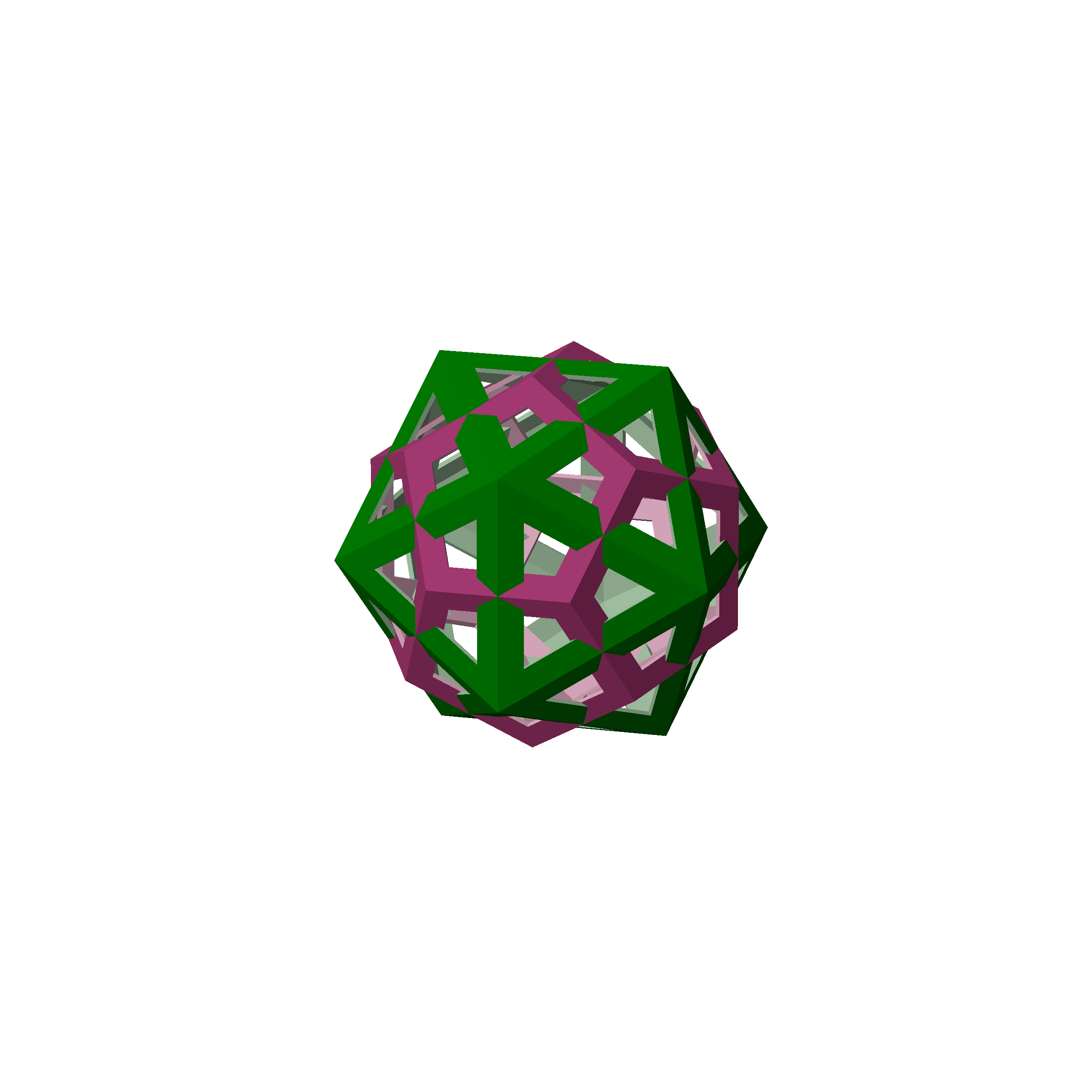
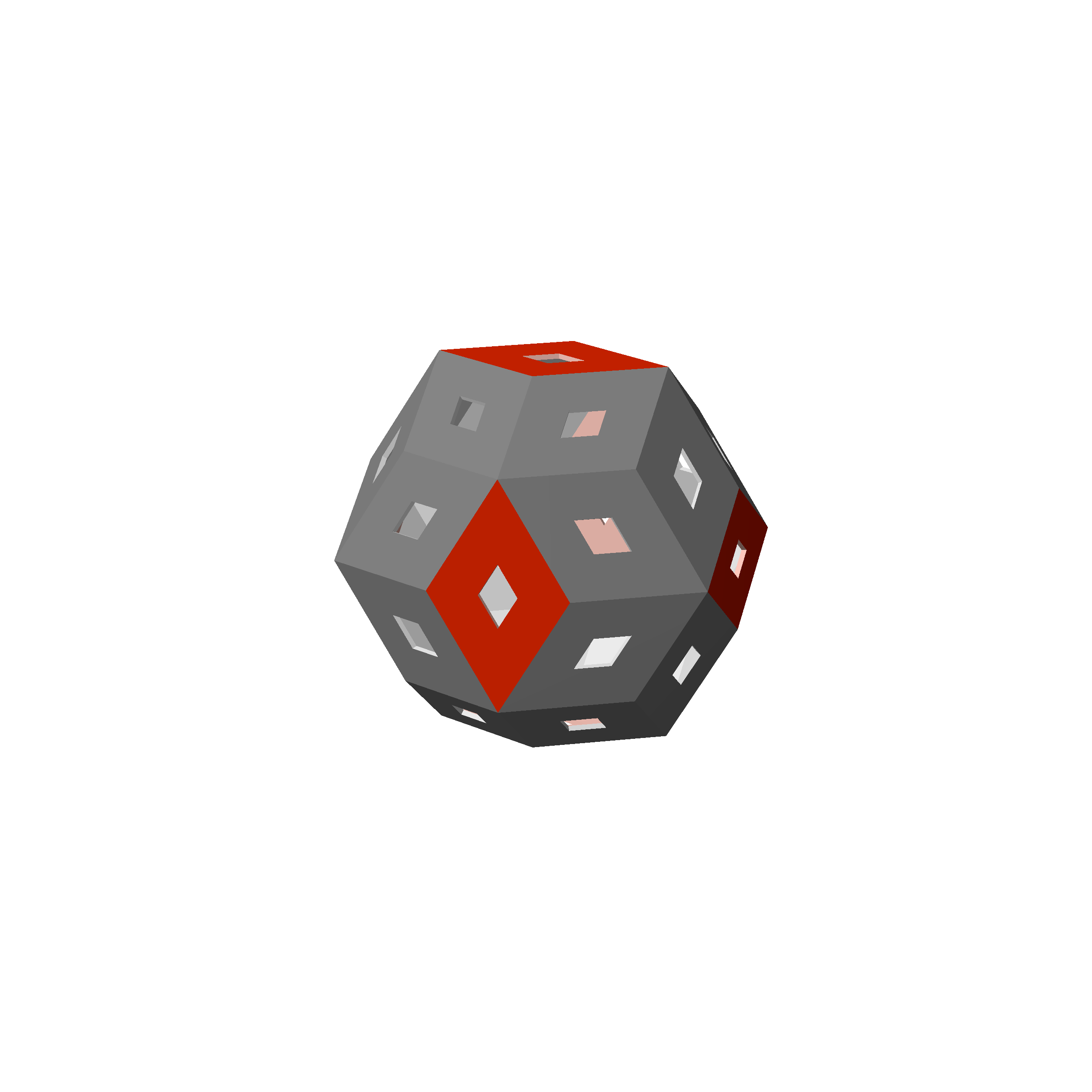
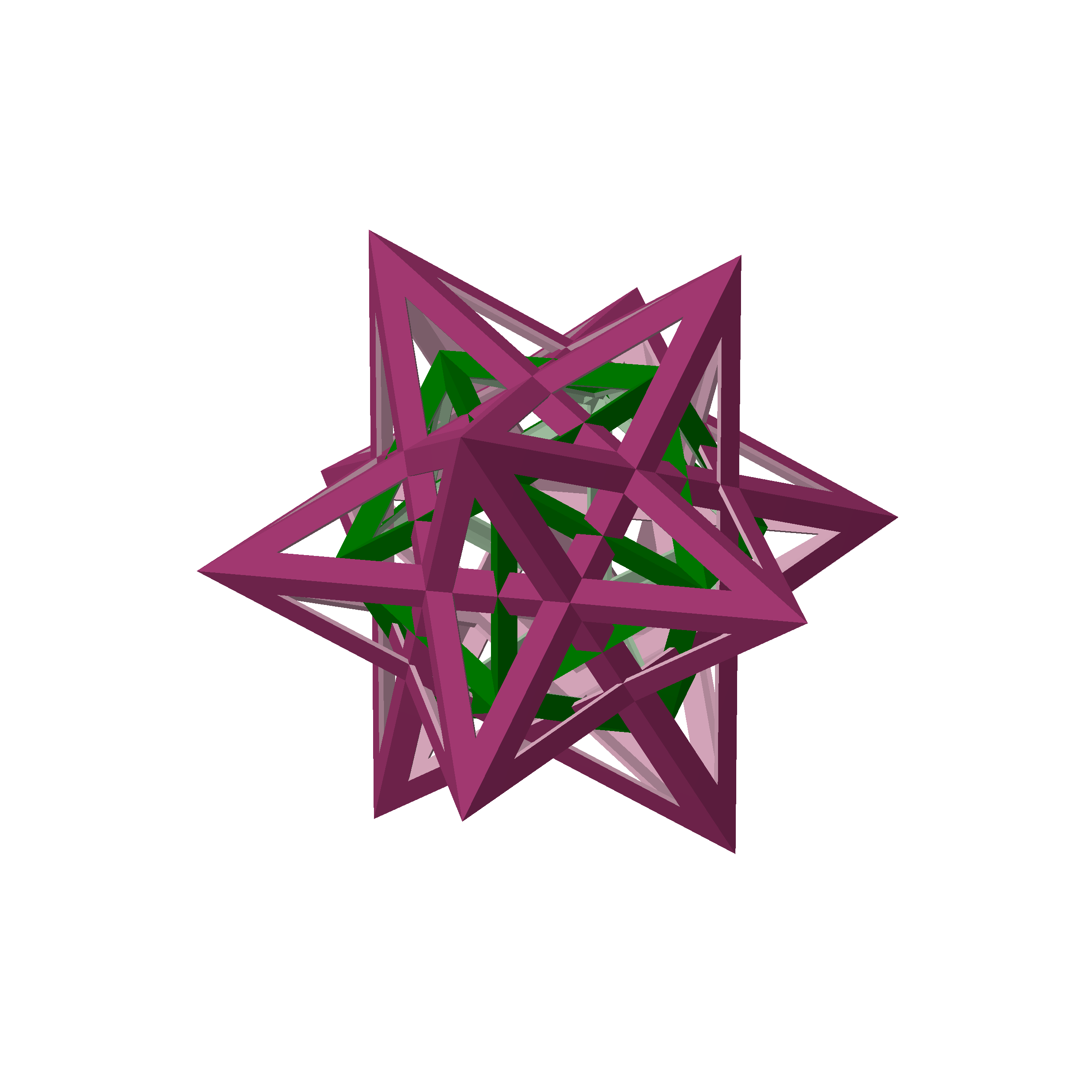
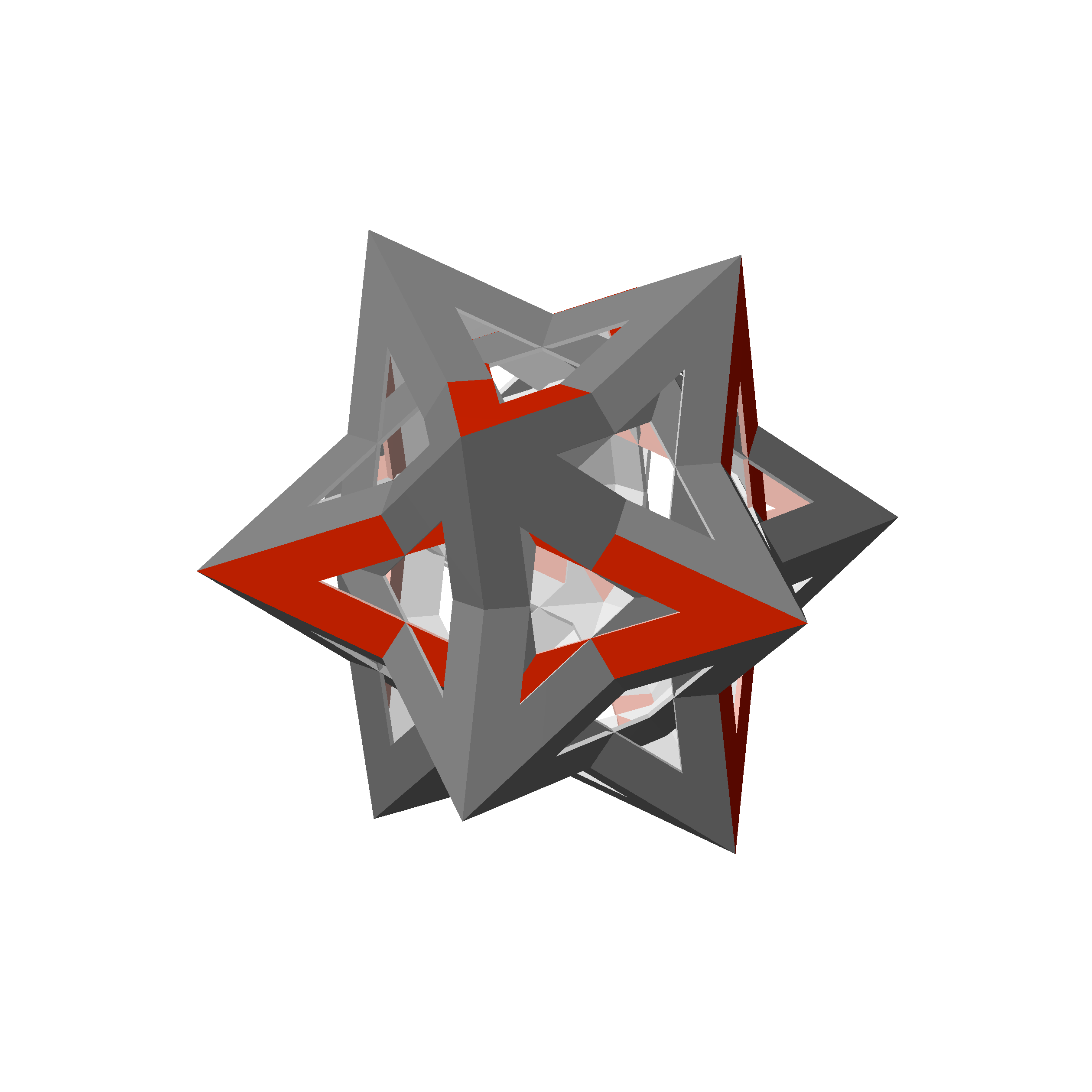
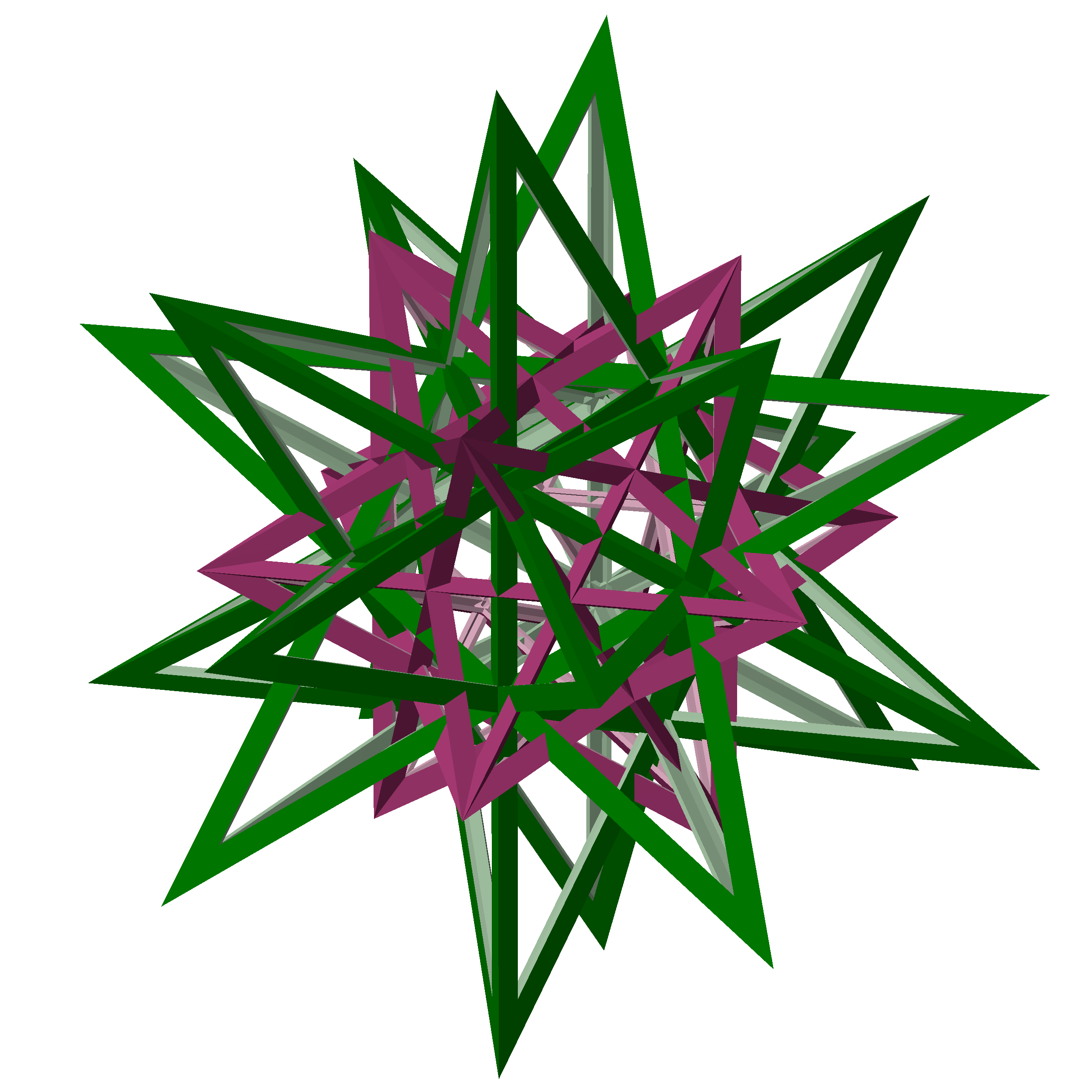
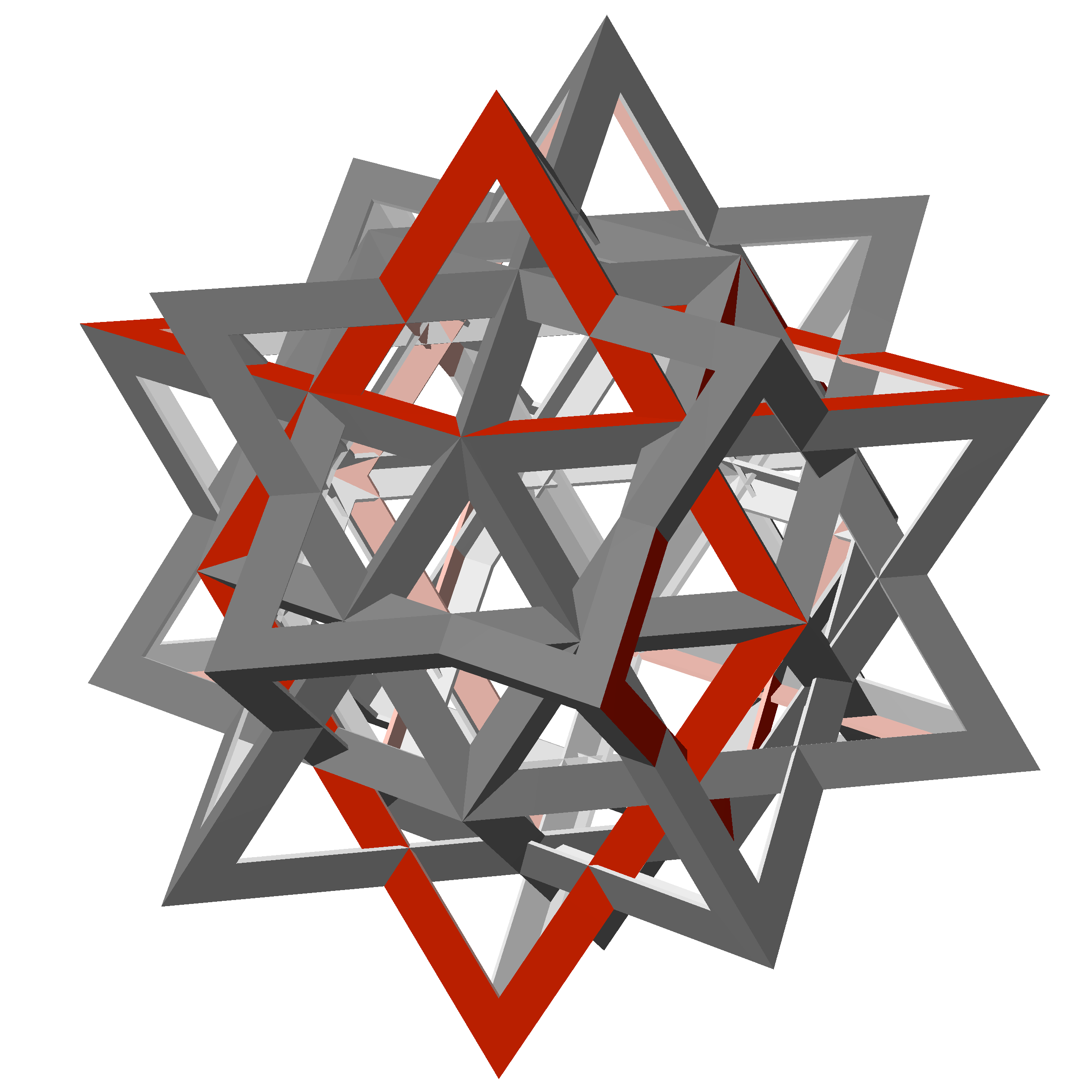
Convex, medial and great rhombic triacontahedron on the right (shown with pyritohedral symmetry) and the corresponding dual compounds of regular solids on the left

The face diagonal lengths of the three rhombic triacontahedra are powers of $\varphi$.

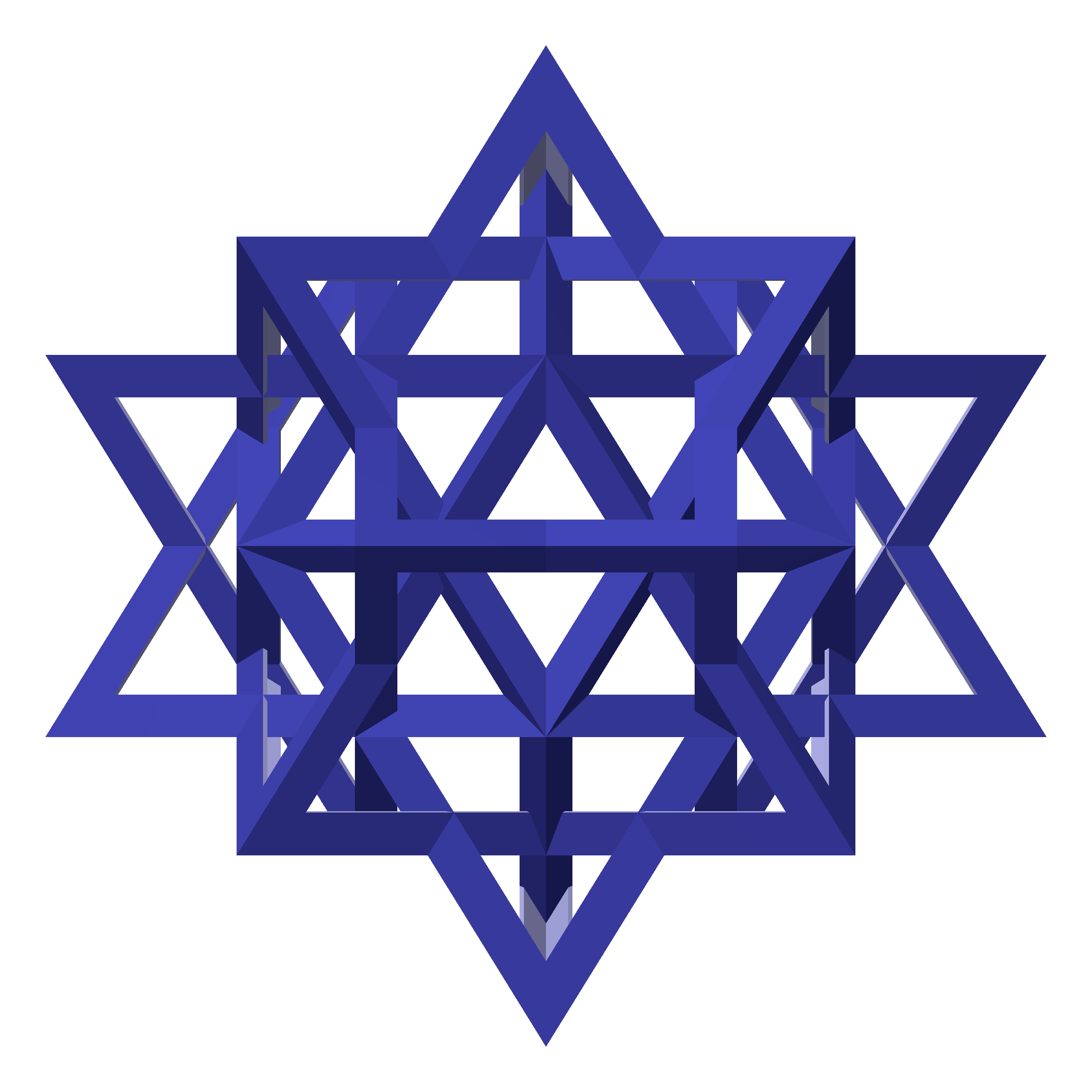
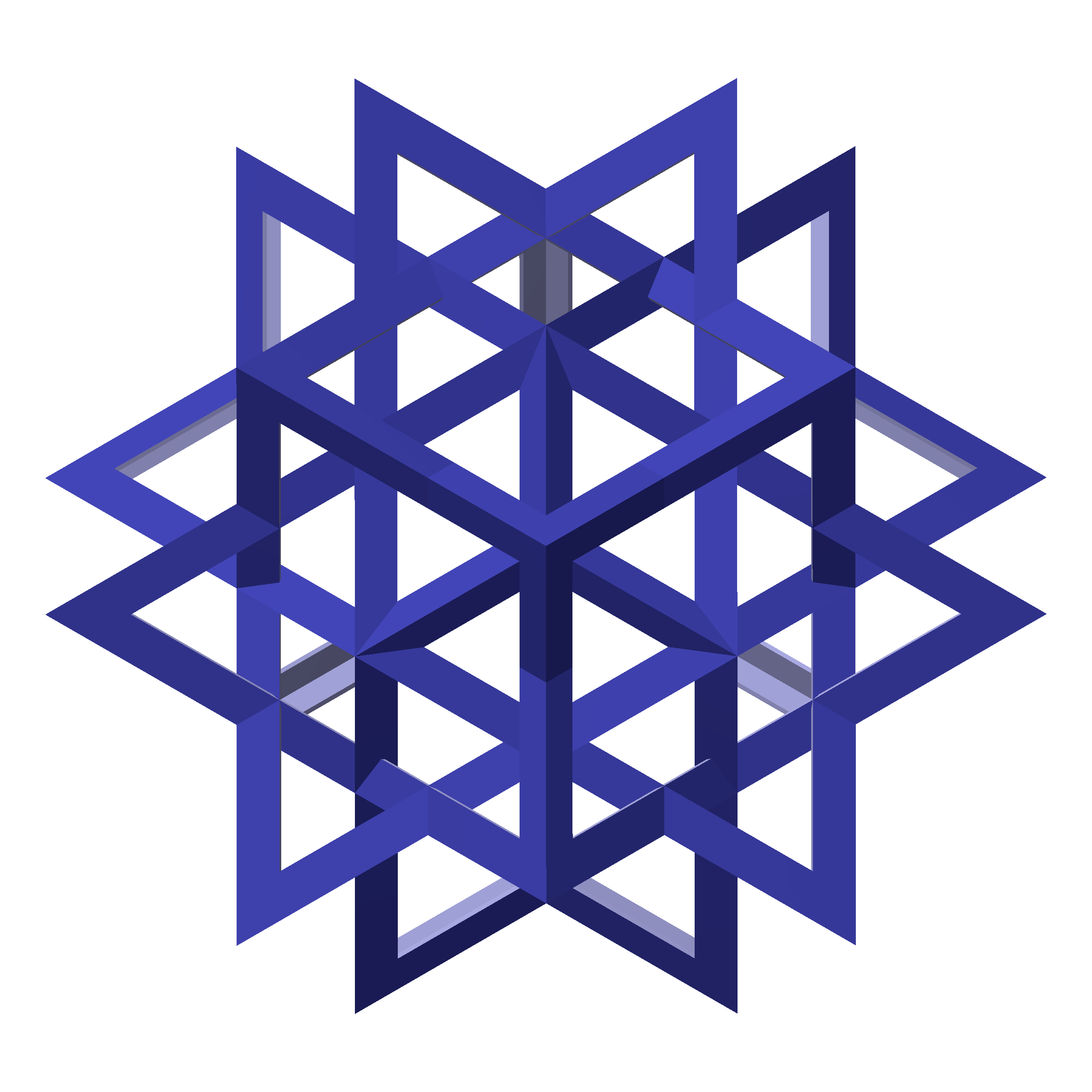
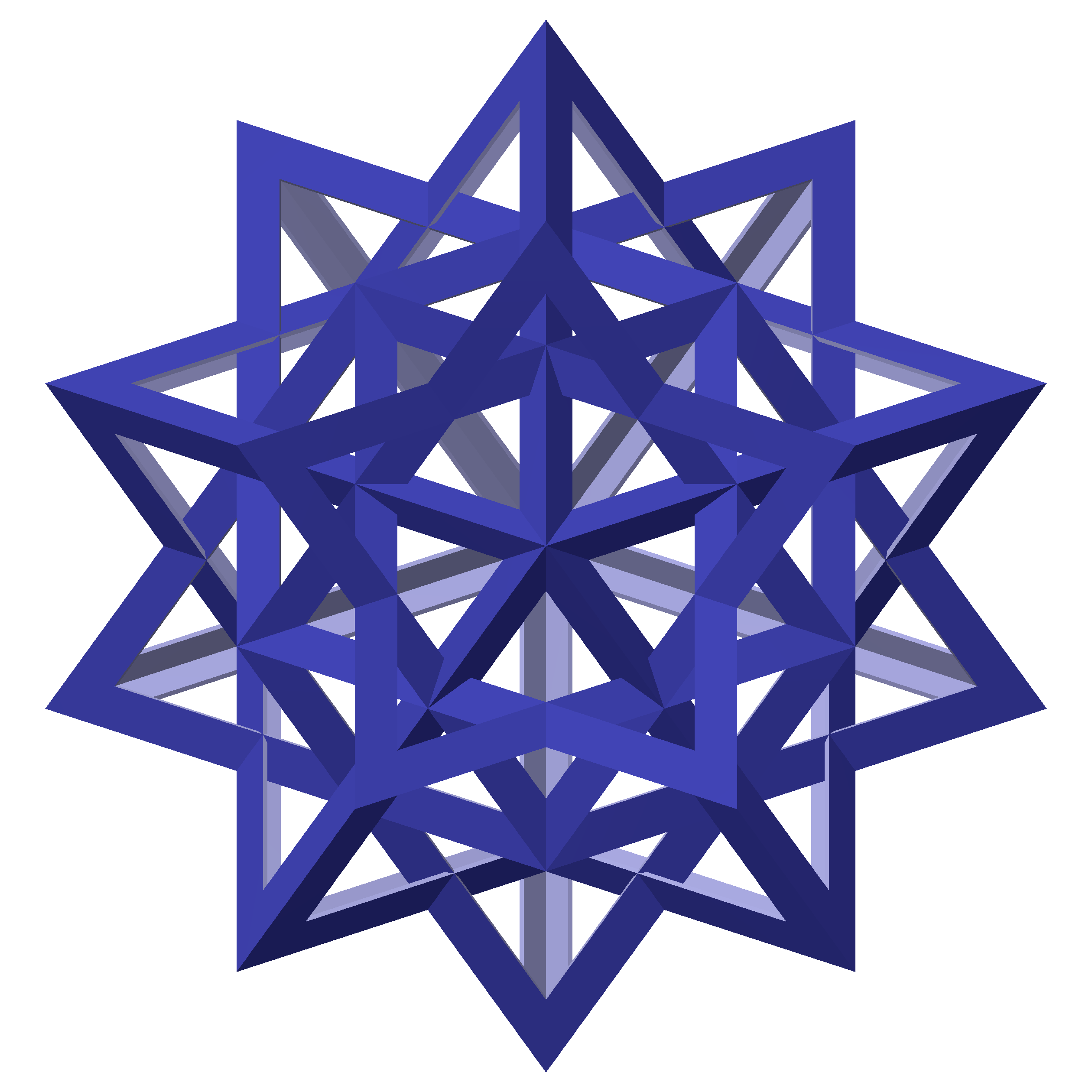
Orthographic projections from 2-, 3- and 5-fold axes
