= W61 =

W61 may refer to:

- W61 (nuclear warhead)
- Compound of great icosahedron and great stellated dodecahedron
- Otoineppu Station, in Hokkaido, Japan
