= Compound of cube and octahedron =

Polyhedral compound

Compound of cube and octahedron
Type	Compound
Coxeter diagram	∪
Stellation core	cuboctahedron
Convex hull	Rhombic dodecahedron
Index	W_{43}
Polyhedra	1 octahedron 1 cube
Faces	8 triangles 6 squares
Edges	24
Vertices	14
Symmetry group	octahedral (O_{h})

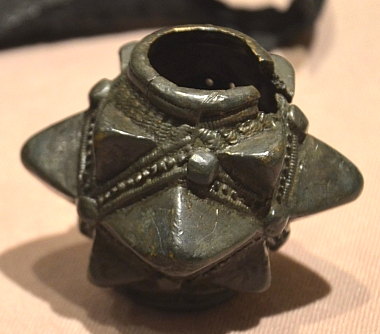
Medieval mace head

The compound of cube and octahedron is a polyhedron which can be seen as either a polyhedral stellation or a compound.

== Construction ==
The 14 Cartesian coordinates of the vertices of the compound are.

6: (±2, 0, 0), ( 0, ±2, 0), ( 0, 0, ±2)
8: ( ±1, ±1, ±1)

== As a compound ==
It can be seen as the compound of an octahedron and a cube. It is one of four compounds constructed from a Platonic solid or Kepler-Poinsot polyhedron and its dual.

It has octahedral symmetry (O_{h}) and shares the same vertices as a rhombic dodecahedron.

This can be seen as the three-dimensional equivalent of the compound of two squares ({8/2} "octagram"); this series continues on to infinity, with the four-dimensional equivalent being the compound of tesseract and 16-cell.

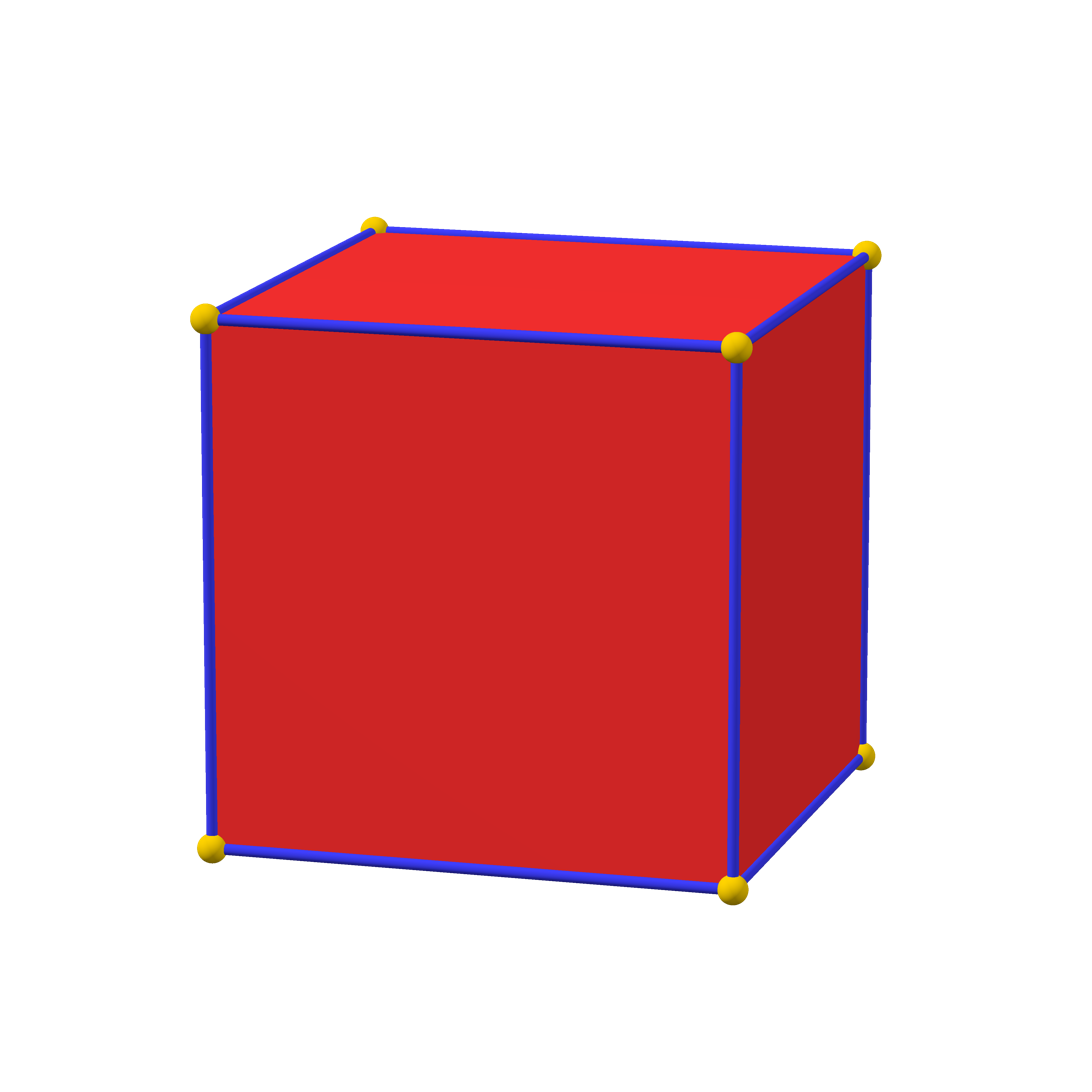
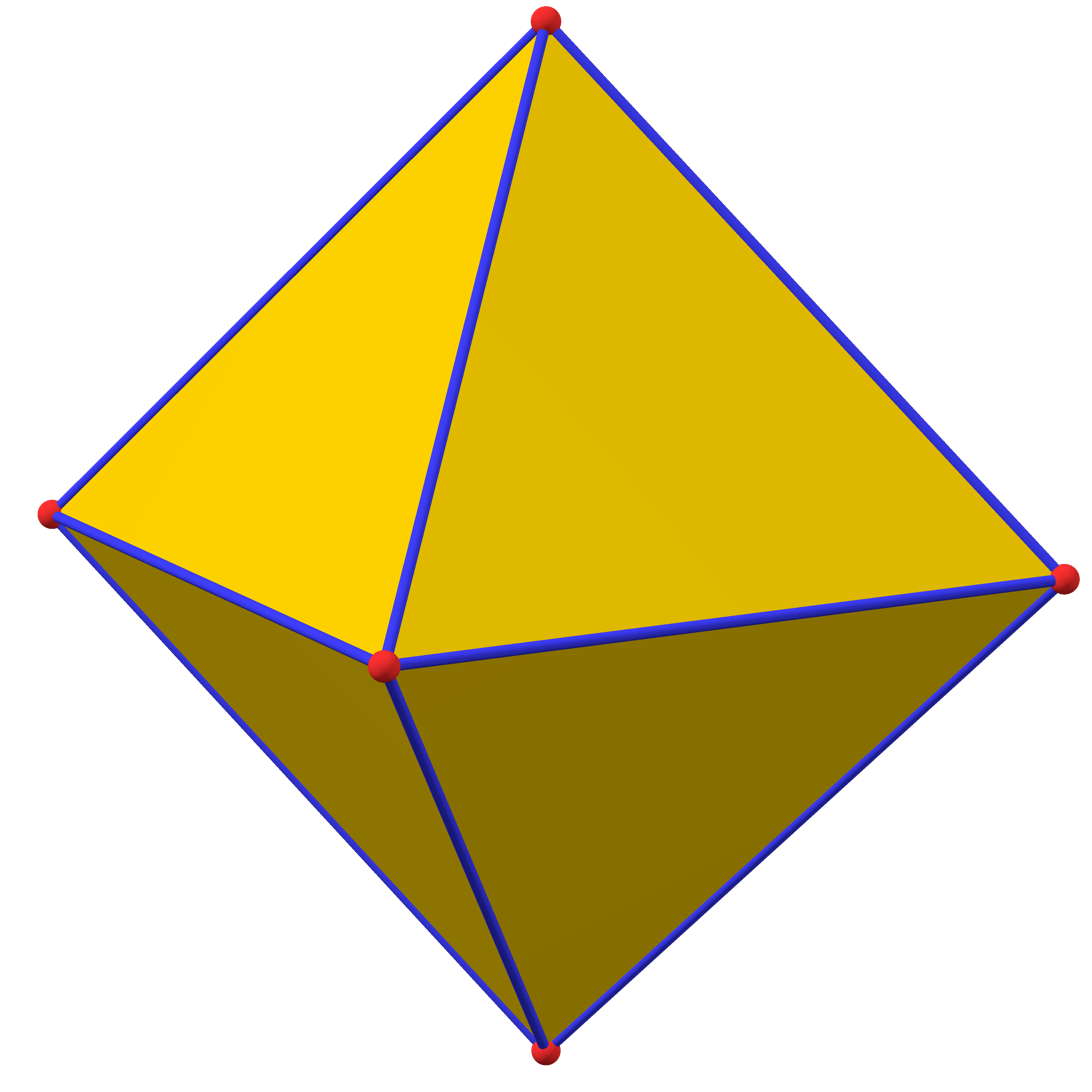
A cube and its dual octahedron

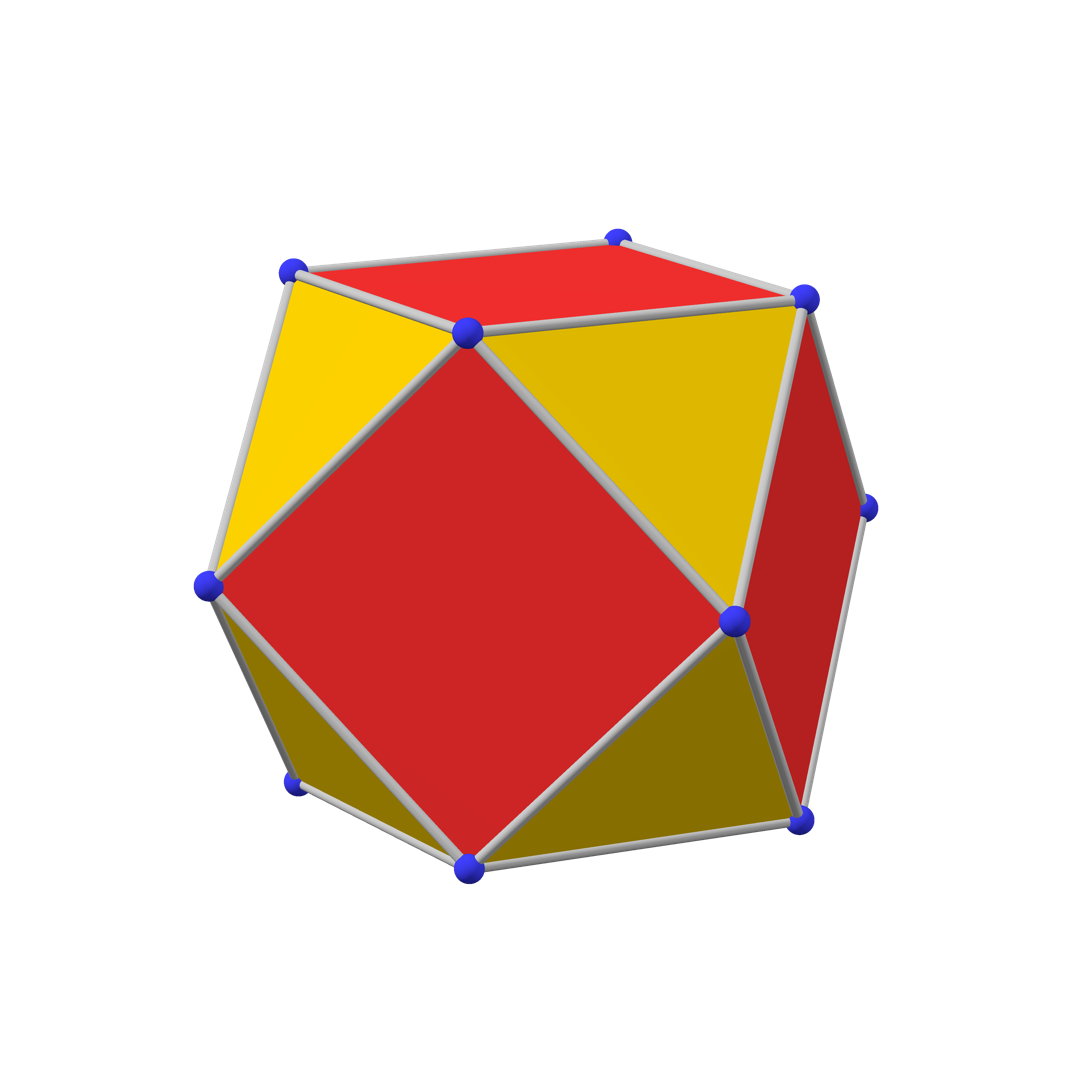
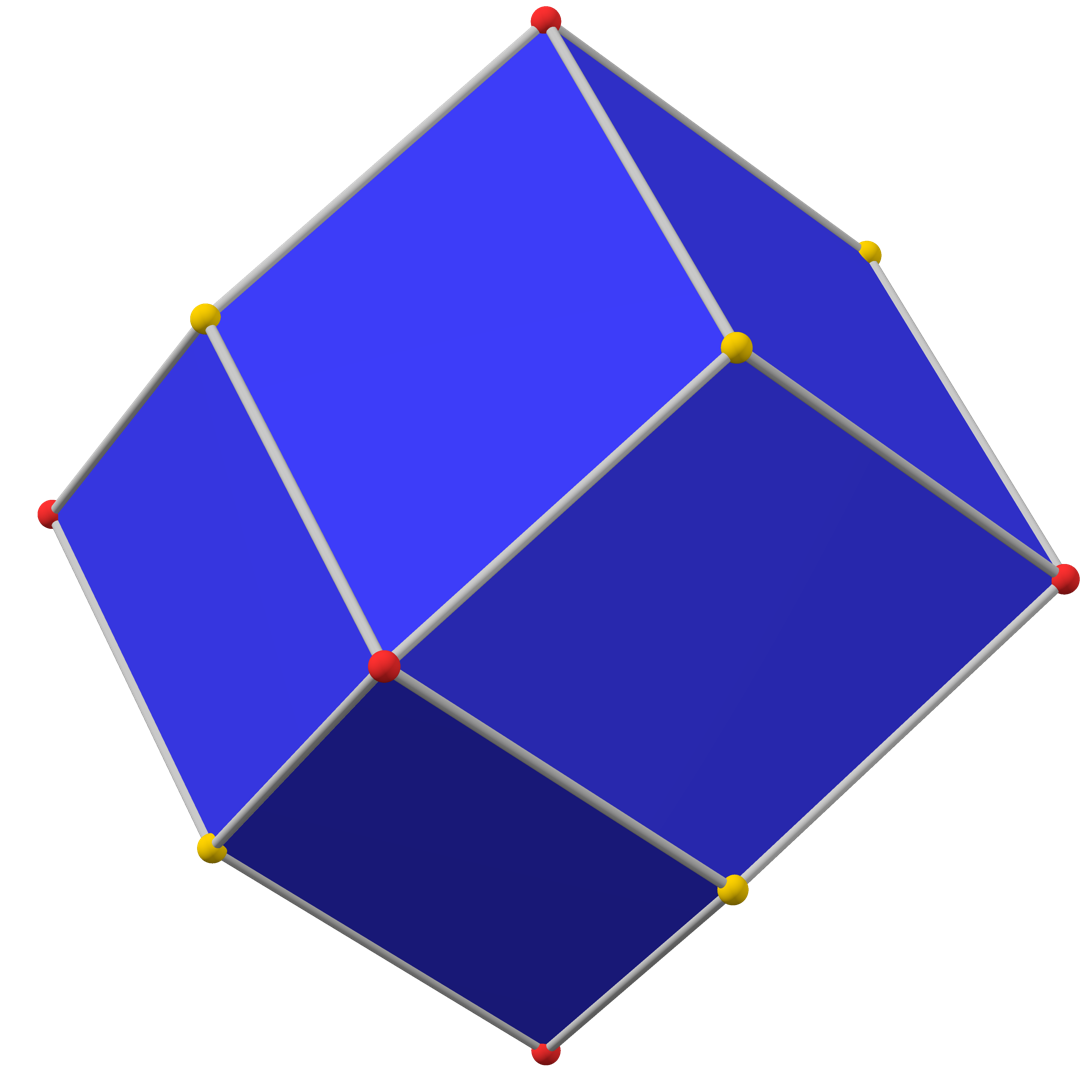
The intersection of both solids is the cuboctahedron, and their convex hull is the rhombic dodecahedron.

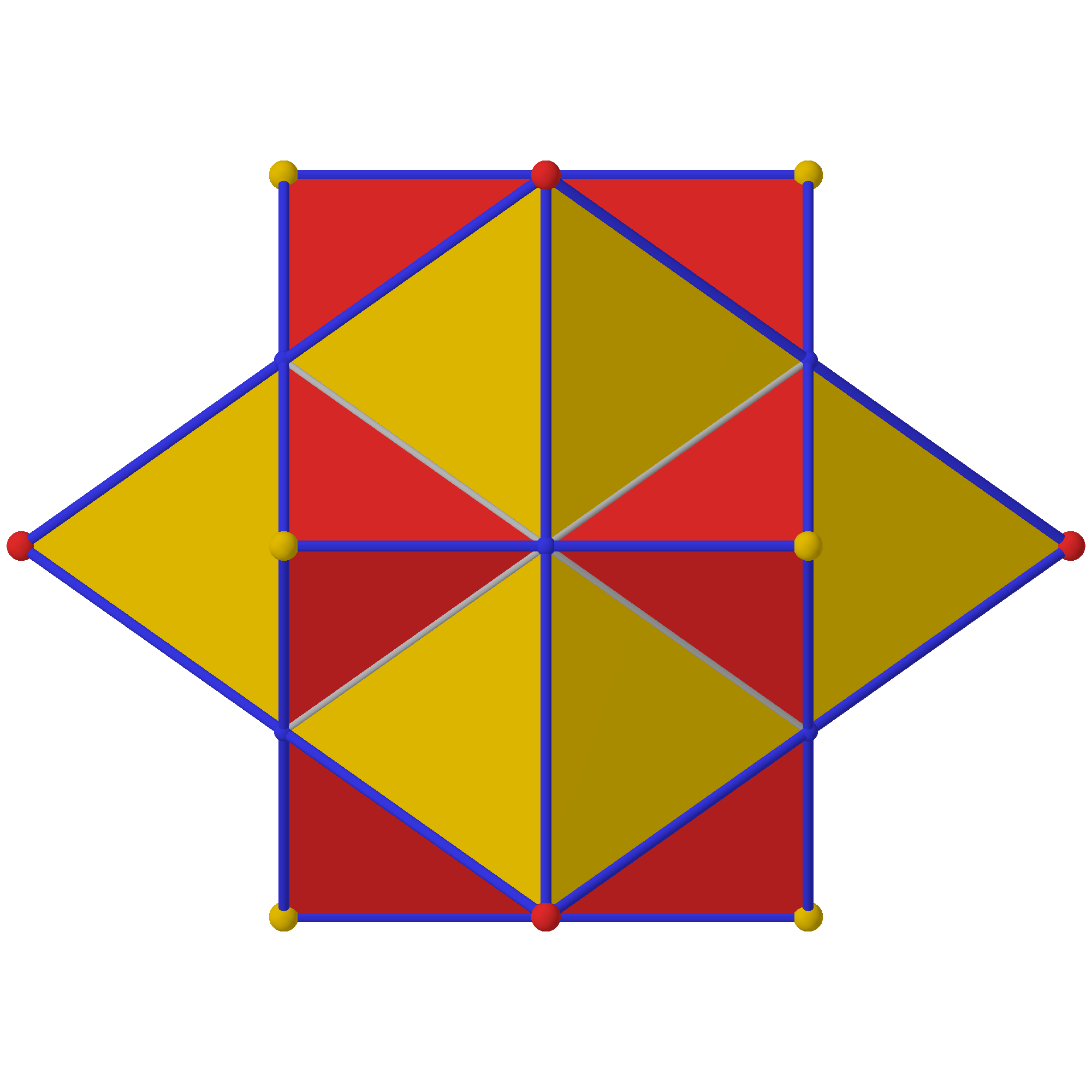
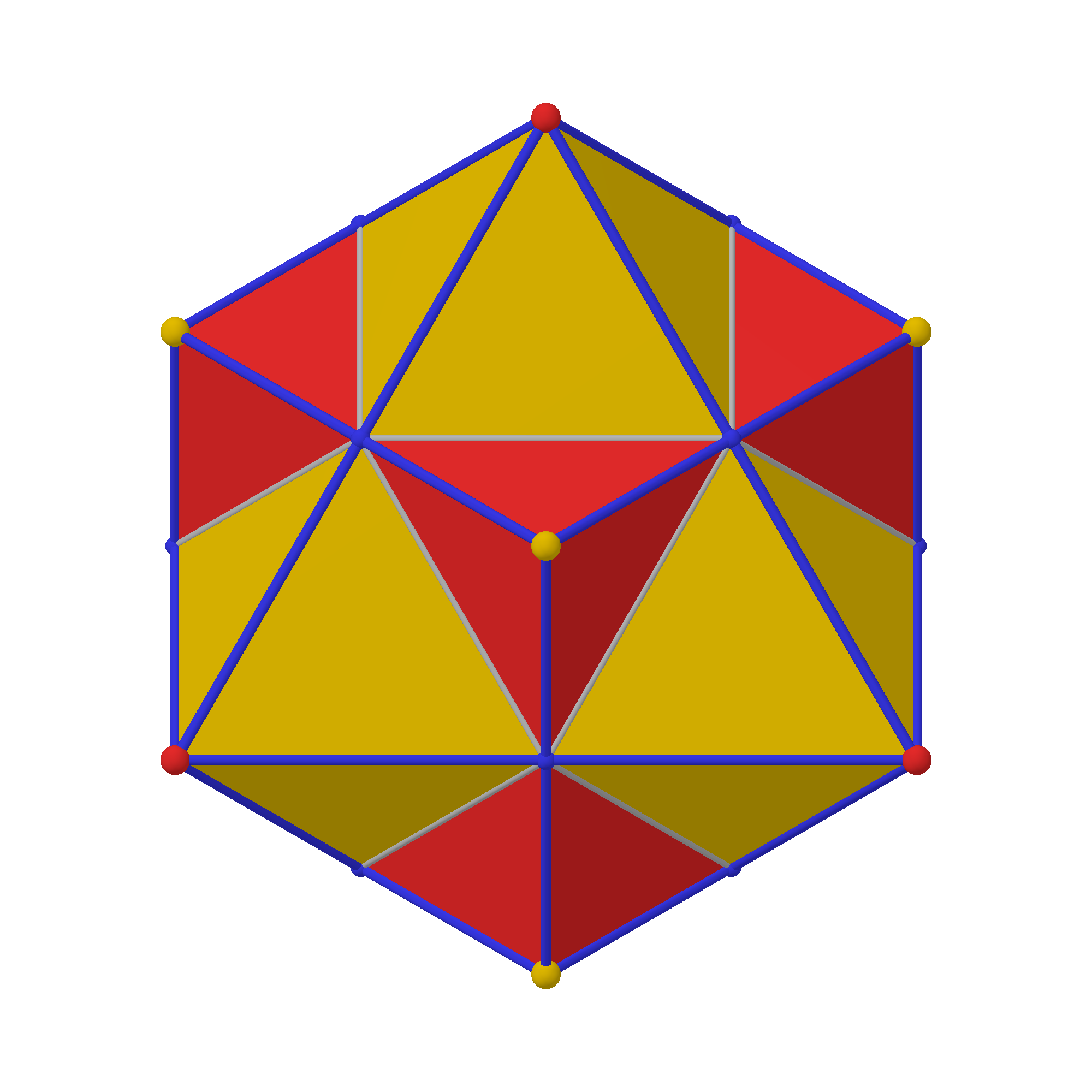
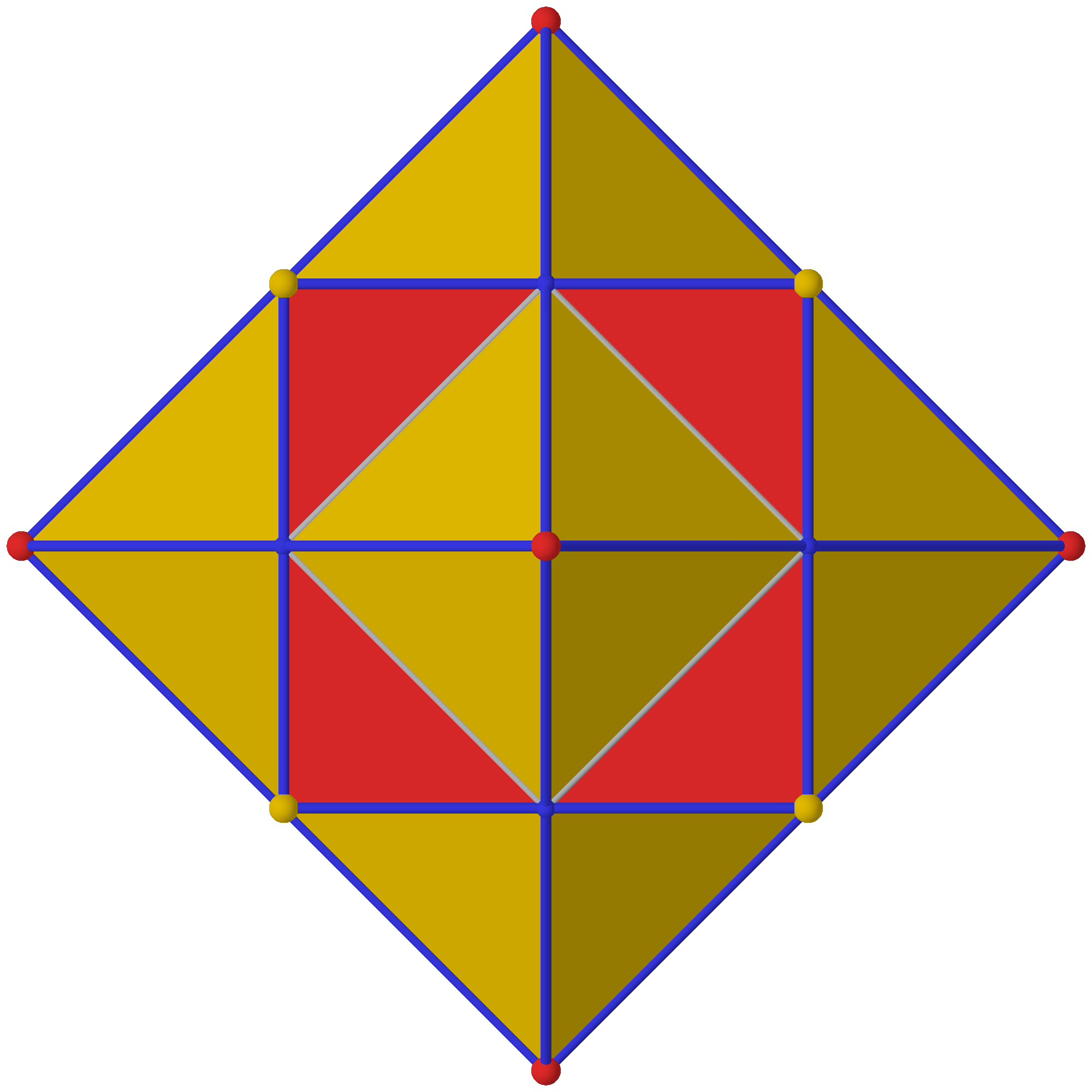
Seen from 2-fold, 3-fold and 4-fold symmetry axes
The hexagon in the middle is the Petrie polygon of both solids.
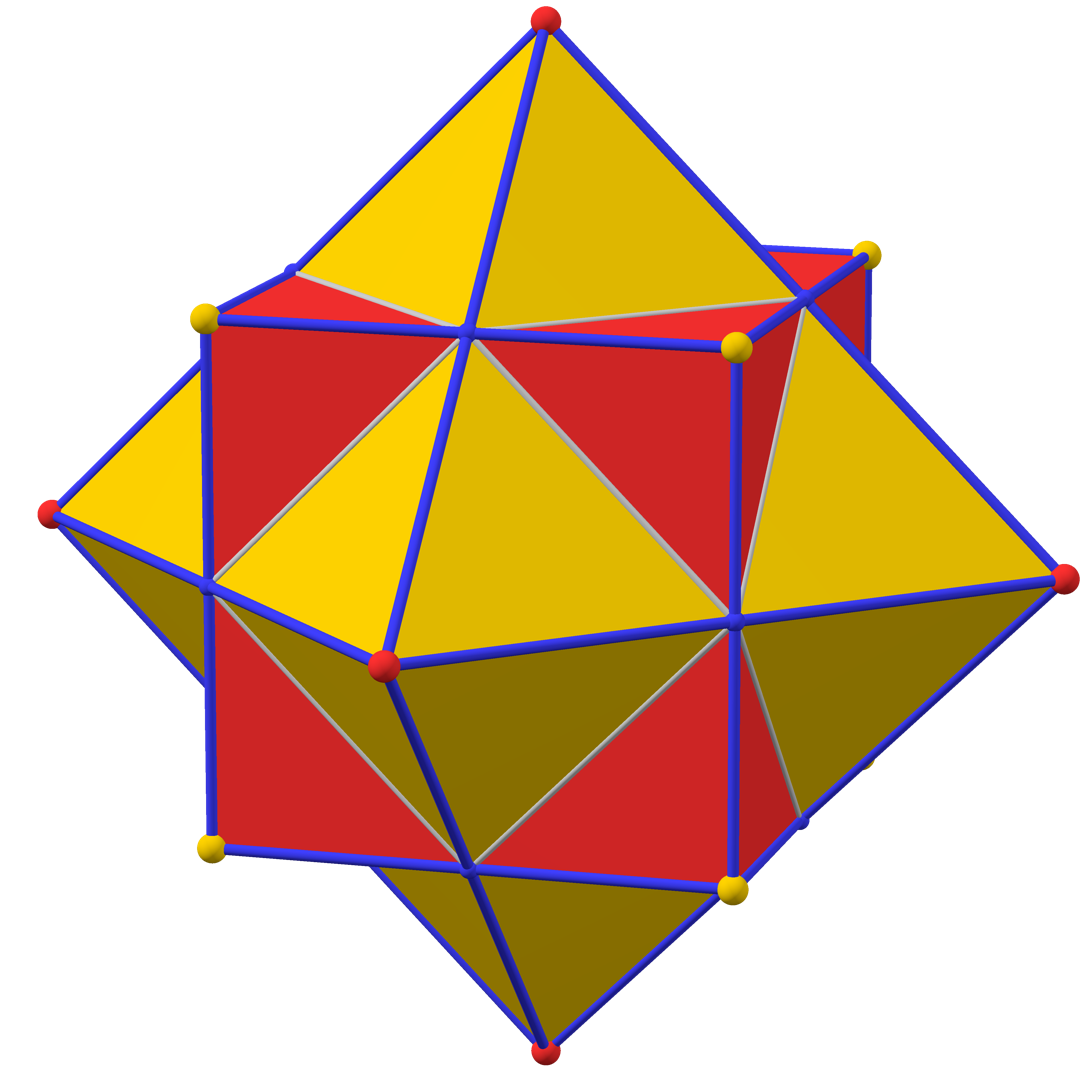
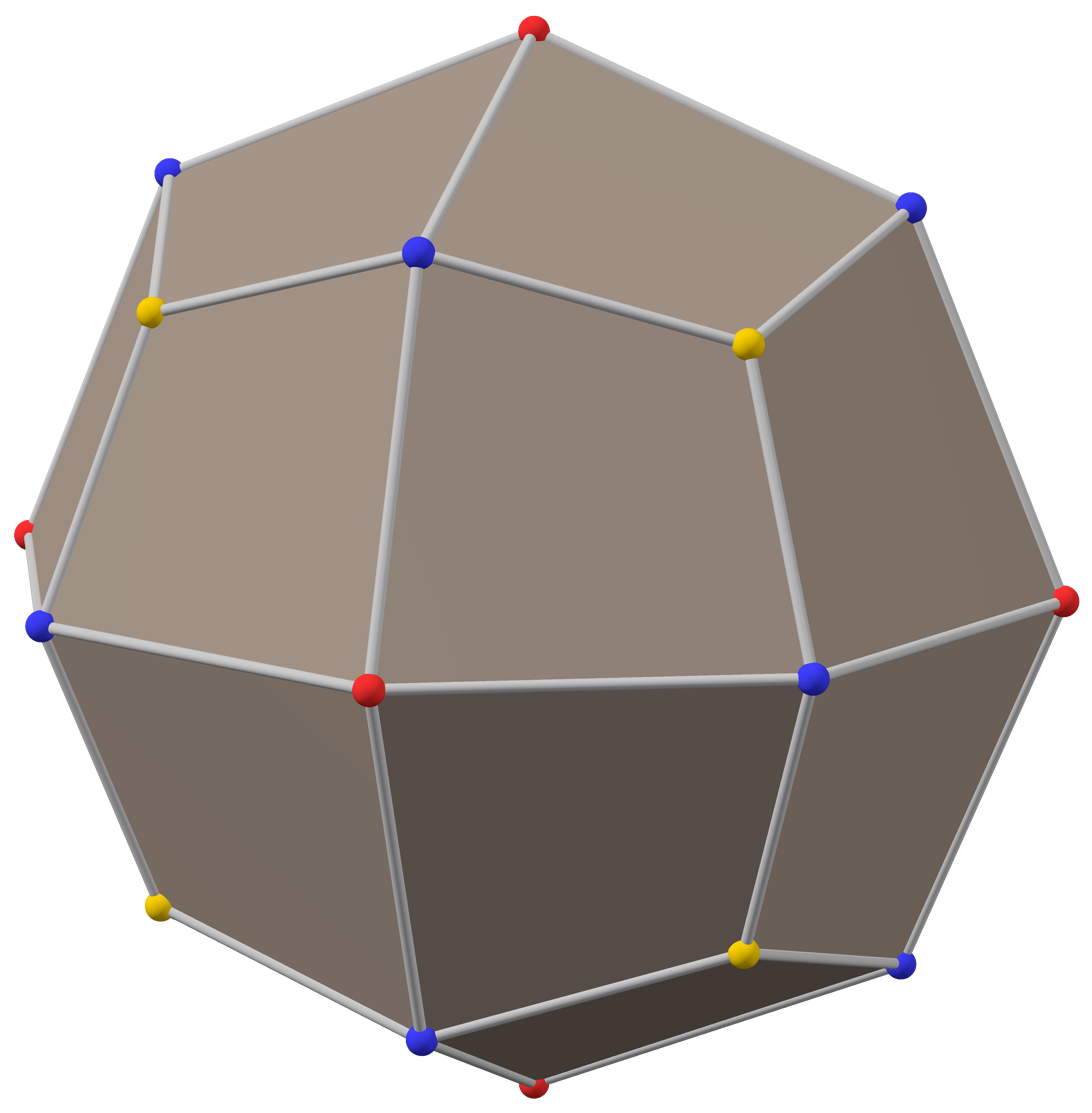
If the edge crossings were vertices, the mapping on a sphere would be the same as that of a deltoidal icositetrahedron.

== As a stellation ==
It is also the first stellation of the cuboctahedron and given as Wenninger model index 43.

It can be seen as a cuboctahedron with square and triangular pyramids added to each face.

The stellation facets for construction are:

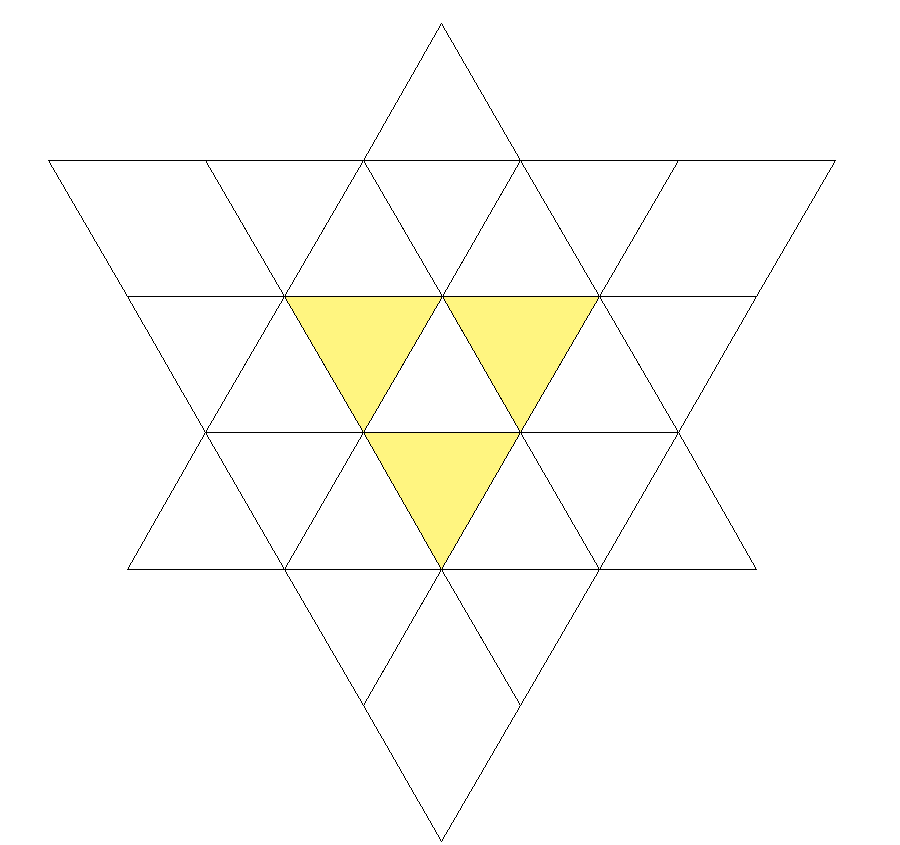
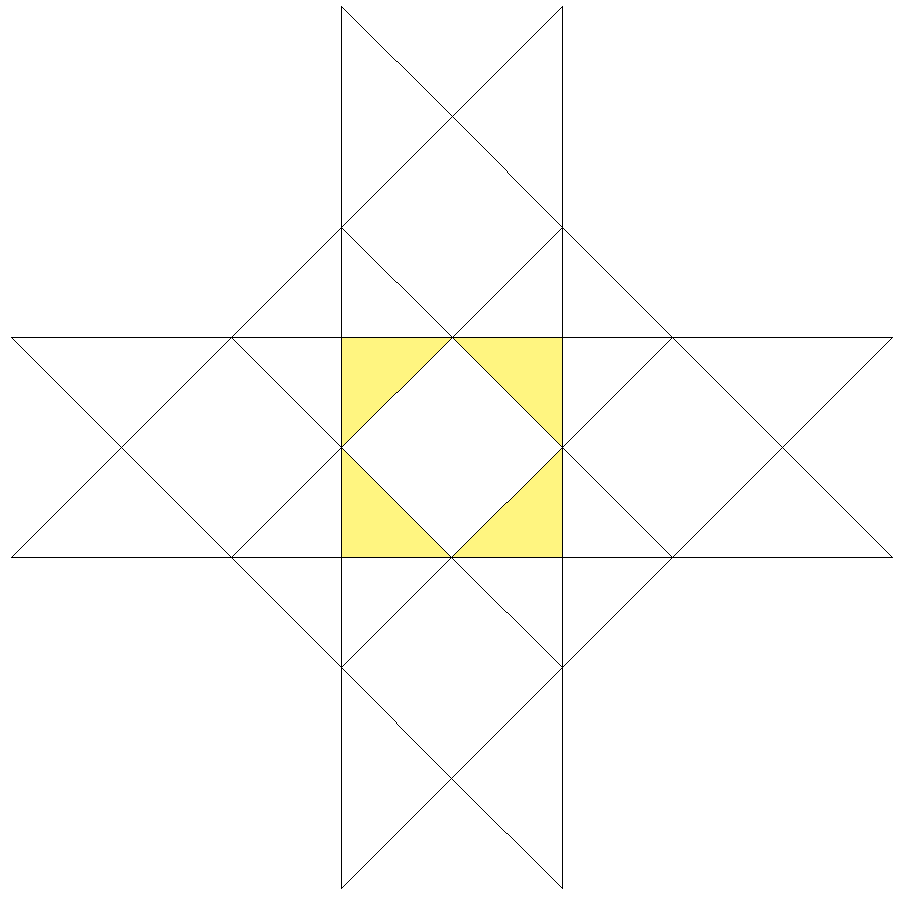

== See also ==
- Compound of two tetrahedra
- Compound of dodecahedron and icosahedron
- Compound of small stellated dodecahedron and great dodecahedron
- Compound of great stellated dodecahedron and great icosahedron
