= Compound of great icosahedron and great stellated dodecahedron =

Two polyhedral compounds with the same name

Compound of great icosahedron and stellated dodecahedron
Type	stellation and compound
Coxeter diagram	∪
Convex hull	Dodecahedron
Polyhedra	1 great icosahedron 1 great stellated dodecahedron
Faces	20 triangles 12 pentagrams
Edges	60
Vertices	32
Symmetry group	icosahedral (I_{h})

There are two different compounds of great icosahedron and great stellated dodecahedron: one is a dual compound and a stellation of the great icosidodecahedron, the other is a stellation of the icosidodecahedron.

== Dual compound ==
It can be seen as a polyhedron compound of a great icosahedron and great stellated dodecahedron. It is one of five compounds constructed from a Platonic solid or Kepler-Poinsot solid, and its dual. It is a stellation of the great icosidodecahedron.

It has icosahedral symmetry (I_{h}) and it has the same vertex arrangement as a great rhombic triacontahedron.

This can be seen as one of the two three-dimensional equivalents of the compound of two pentagrams ({10/4} "decagram"); this series continues into the fourth dimension as compounds of star 4-polytopes.

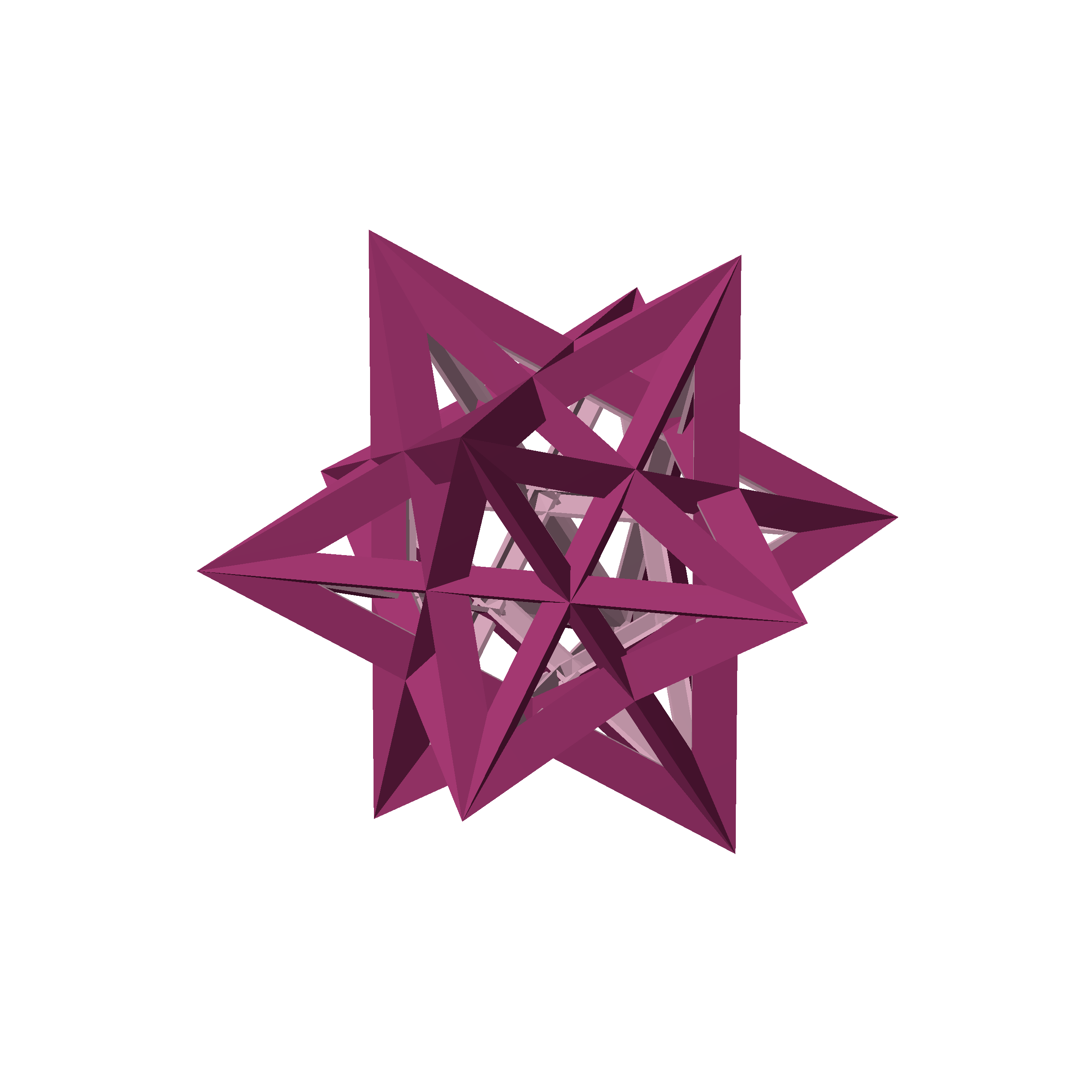
great icosahedron

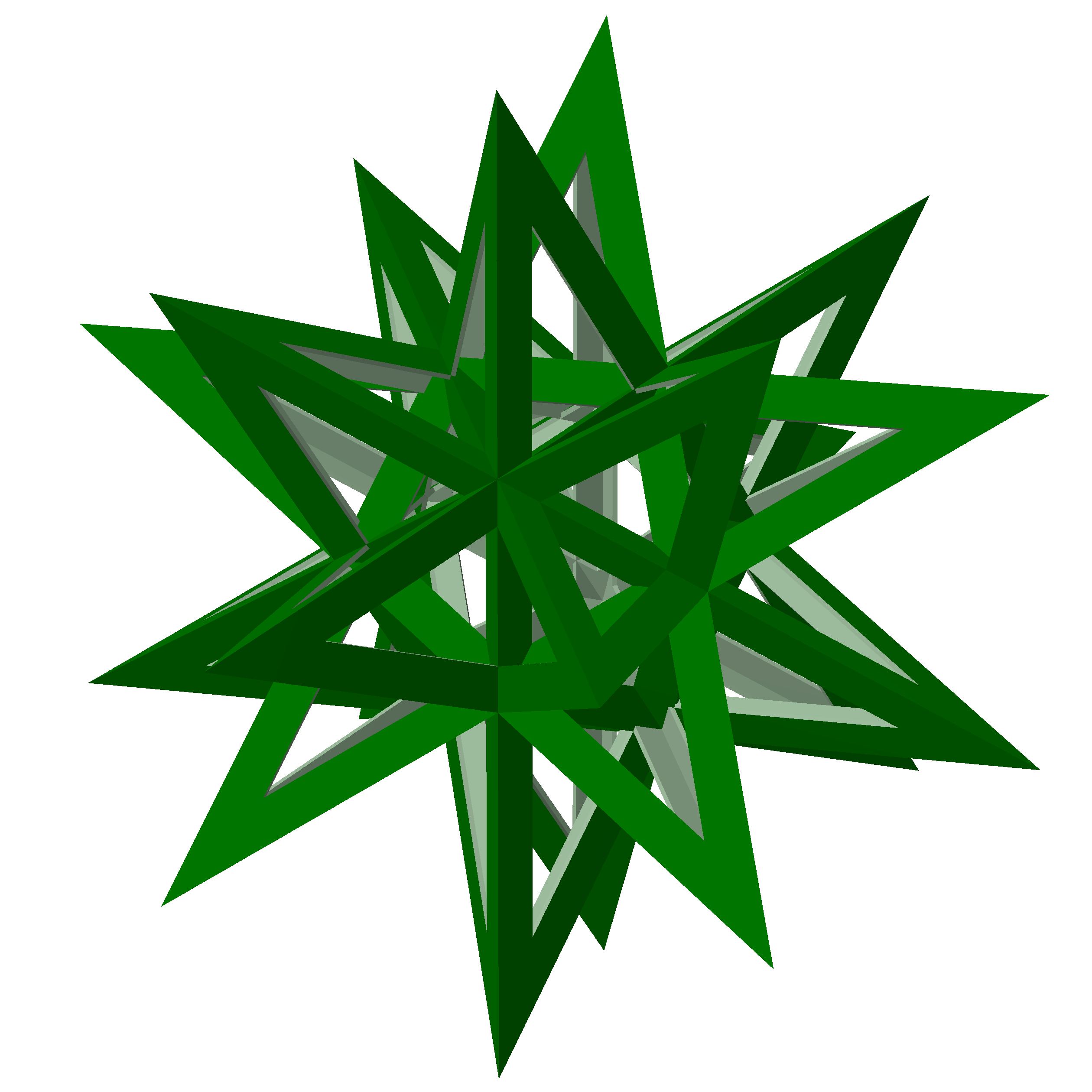
great stellated dodecahedron

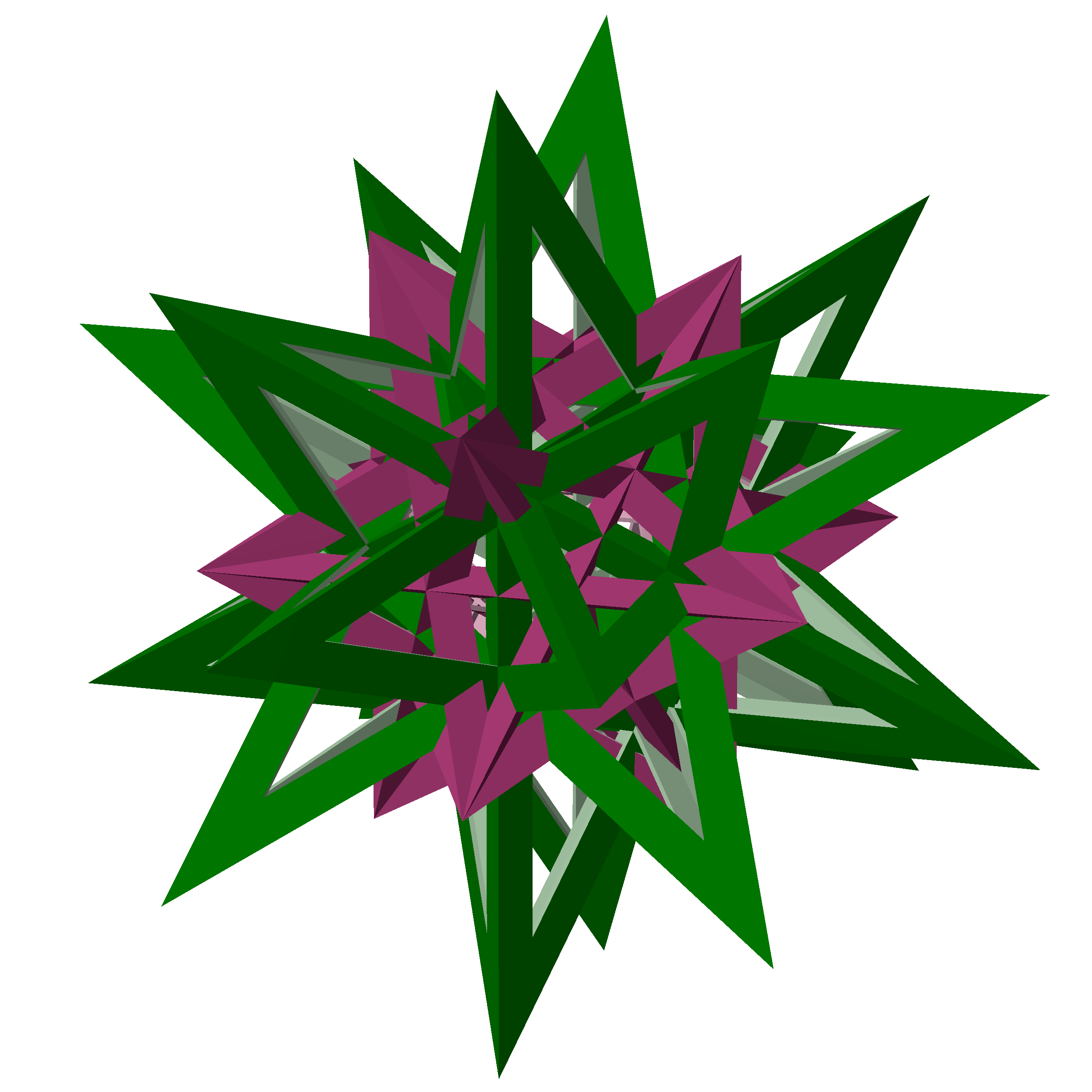
compound

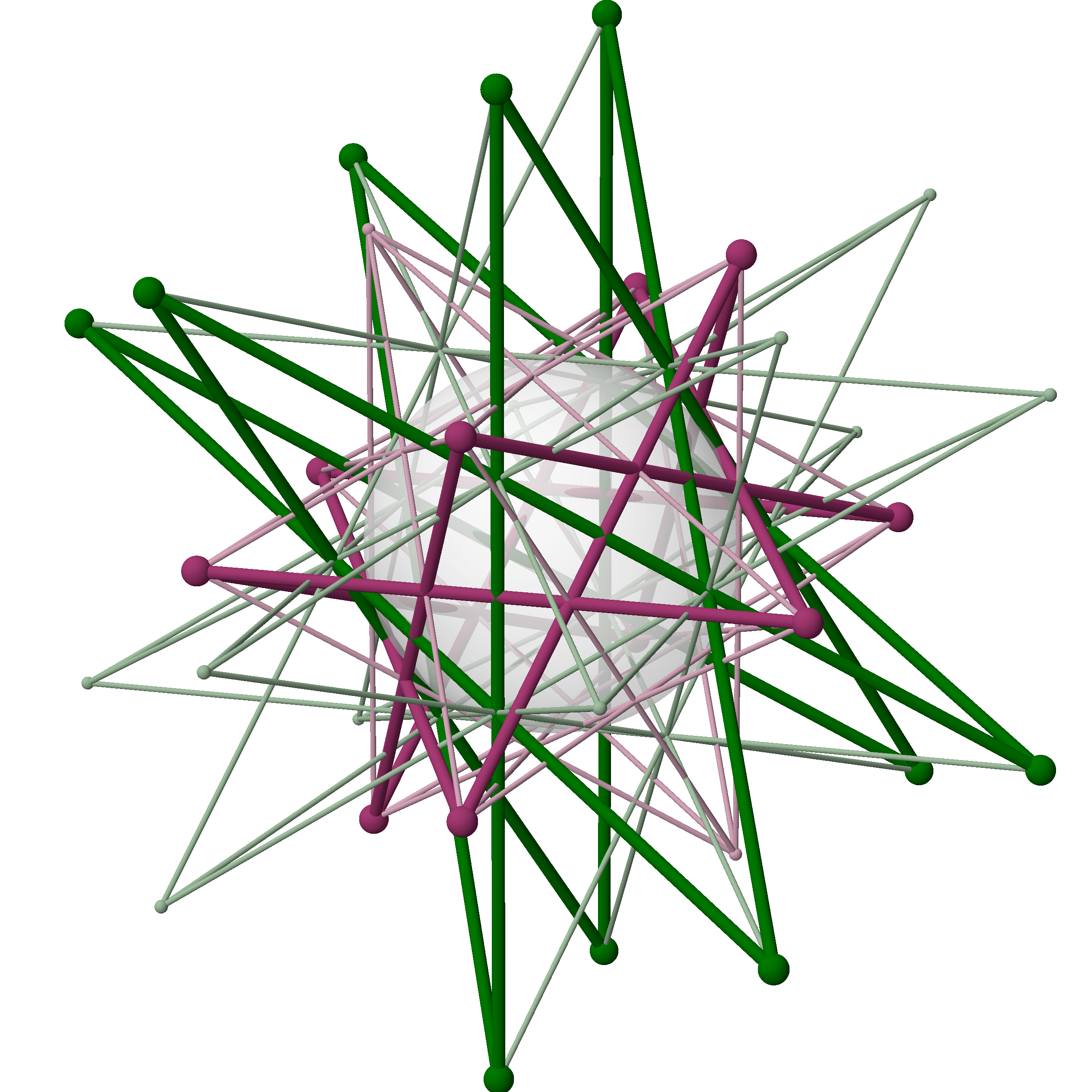
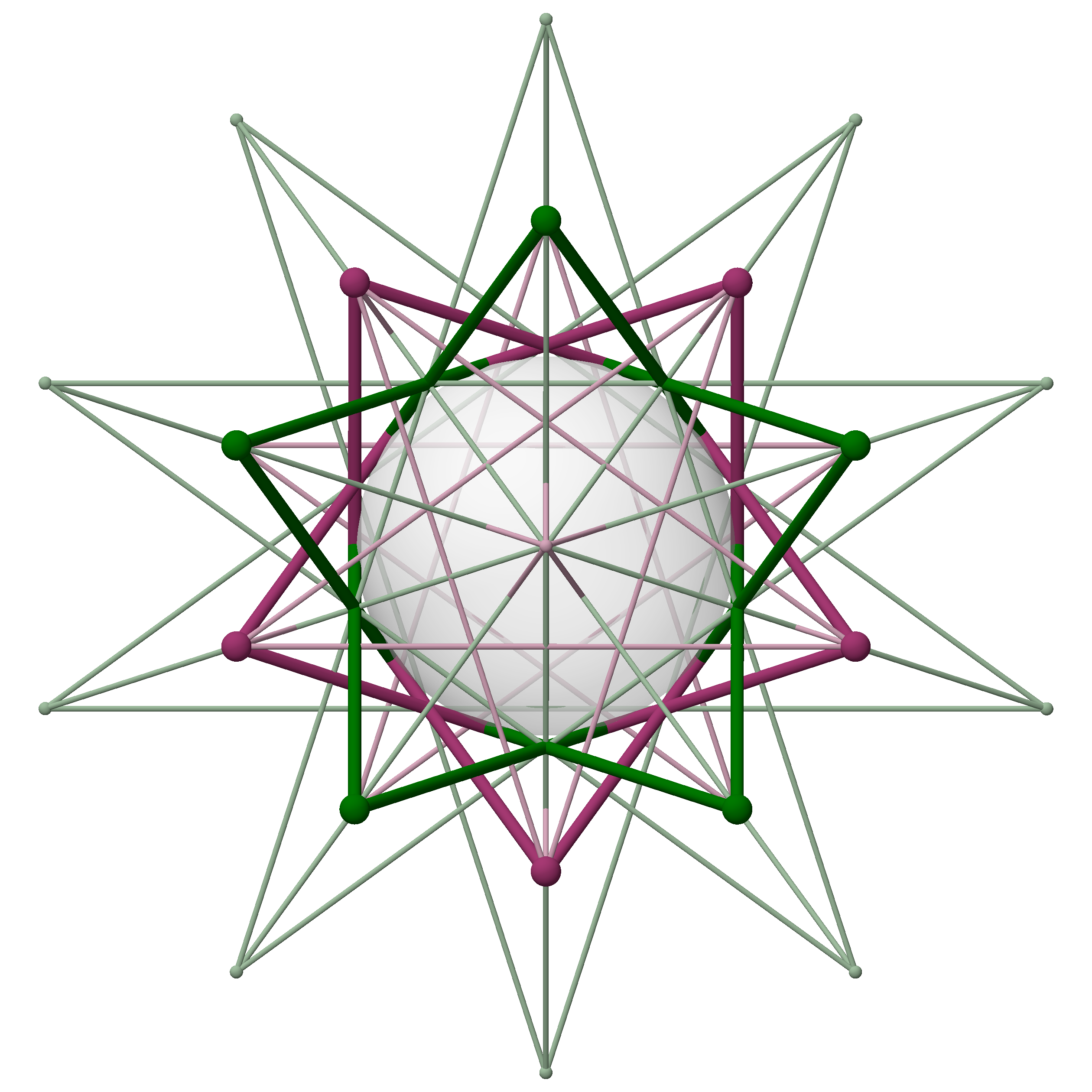
Petrie decagrams of both solids

== Stellation of the icosidodecahedron ==
This polyhedron is a stellation of the icosidodecahedron, and given as Wenninger model index 61. It has the same vertex arrangement as a rhombic triacontahedron, its convex hull.

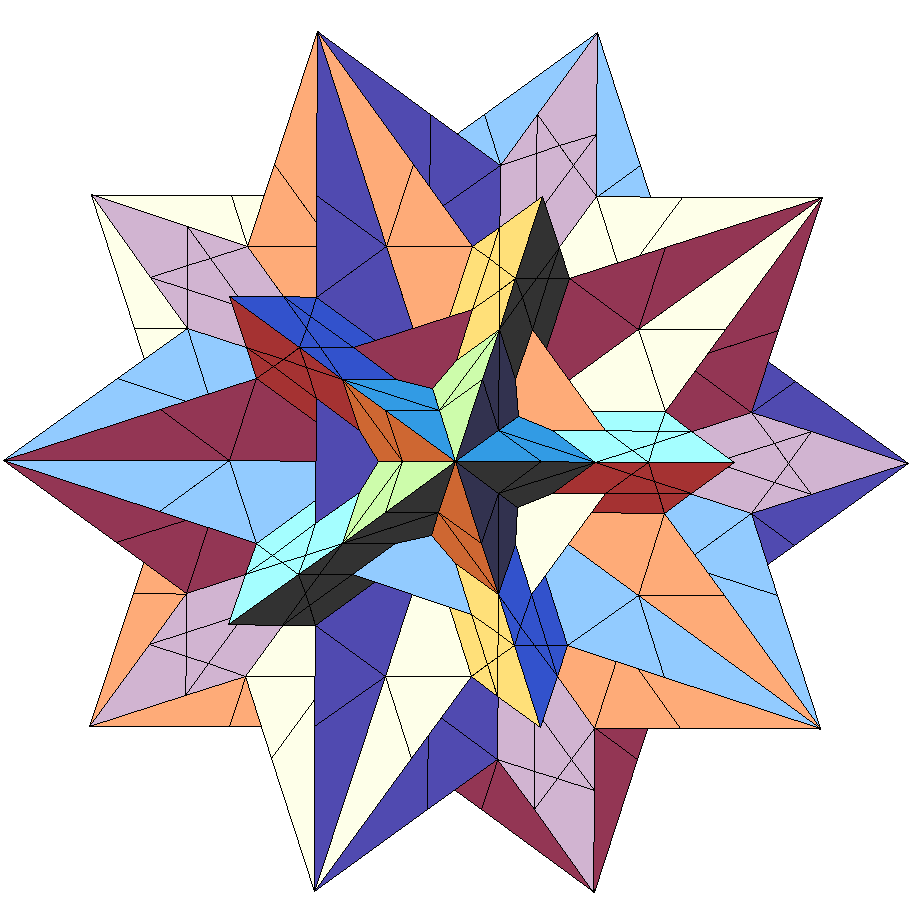

The stellation facets for construction are:

Facets from triangle	Facets from pentagon

== See also ==
- Compound of two tetrahedra
- Compound of cube and octahedron
- Compound of dodecahedron and icosahedron
- Compound of small stellated dodecahedron and great dodecahedron
