= Decagram (geometry) =

10-pointed star polygon

Regular decagram
- A regular decagram
- Type: Regular star polygon
- Edges and vertices: 10
- Schläfli symbol: {10/3} t{5/3}
- Symmetry group: Dihedral (D_{10})
- Internal angle (degrees): 72°
- Properties: star, cyclic, equilateral, isogonal, isotoxal
- Dual polygon: self

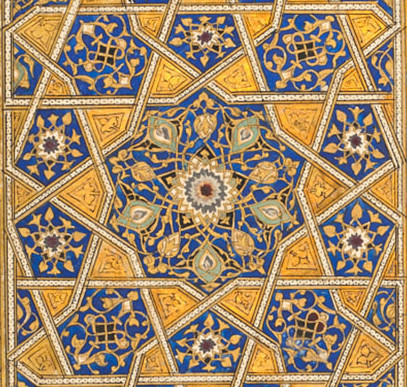
Decagrams are common in Islamic geometric patterns, here in a Quran from the 14th century.

In geometry, a decagram is a 10-point star polygon. There is one regular decagram, containing the vertices of a regular decagon, but connected by every third point. Its Schläfli symbol is {10/3}.

The name decagram combines a numeral prefix, deca-, with the Greek suffix -gram (from Greek γραμμῆς (grammēs) 'line').

== Regular decagram ==
For a regular decagram with unit edge lengths, the proportions of the crossing points on each edge are as shown below.

== Applications ==
Decagrams have been used as one of the decorative motifs in girih tiles.

== Isotoxal variations ==
An isotoxal polygon has two vertices and one edge. There are isotoxal decagram forms, which alternates vertices at two radii. Each form has a freedom of one angle. The first is a variation of a double-wound of a pentagon {5}, and last is a variation of a double-wound of a pentagram {5/2}. The middle is a variation of a regular decagram, {10/3}.

{(5/2)_{α}}	{(5/3)_{α}}	{(5/4)_{α}}

== Related figures ==
A regular decagram is a 10-sided polygram, represented by symbol {10/n}, containing the same vertices as regular decagon. Only one of these polygrams, {10/3} (connecting every third point), forms a regular star polygon, but there are also three ten-vertex polygrams which can be interpreted as regular compounds:

- {10/5} is a compound of five degenerate digons 5{2}
- {10/4} is a compound of two pentagrams 2{5/2}
- {10/2} is a compound of two pentagons 2{5}.

Form	Convex	Compound	Star polygon	Compounds	
Image					
Symbol	{10/1} = {10}	{10/2} = 2{5}	{10/3}	{10/4} = 2{5/2}	{10/5} = 5{2}

{10/2} can be seen as the 2D equivalent of the 3D compound of dodecahedron and icosahedron and 4D compound of 120-cell and 600-cell; that is, the compound of two pentagonal polytopes in their respective dual positions.

{10/4} can be seen as the two-dimensional equivalent of the three-dimensional compound of small stellated dodecahedron and great dodecahedron or compound of great icosahedron and great stellated dodecahedron through similar reasons. It has six four-dimensional analogues, with two of these being compounds of two self-dual star polytopes, like the pentagram itself; the compound of two great 120-cells and the compound of two grand stellated 120-cells. A full list can be seen at Polytope compound#Compounds with duals.

Deeper truncations of the regular pentagon and pentagram can produce intermediate star polygon forms with ten equally spaced vertices and two edge lengths that remain vertex-transitive (any two vertices can be transformed into each other by a symmetry of the figure).

Isogonal truncations of pentagon and pentagram
Quasiregular	Isogonal	Quasiregular Double covering
t{5} = {10}		t{5/4} = {10/4} = 2{5/2}
t{5/3} = {10/3}		t{5/2} = {10/2} = 2{5}

== See also ==
- List of regular polytopes and compounds § Stars
