= Compound of dodecahedron and icosahedron =

Polyhedral compound

First stellation of icosidodecahedron
Type	Dual compound
Coxeter diagram	∪
Stellation core	icosidodecahedron
Convex hull	Rhombic triacontahedron
Index	W_{47}
Polyhedra	1 icosahedron 1 dodecahedron
Faces	20 triangles 12 pentagons
Edges	60
Vertices	32
Symmetry group	icosahedral (I_{h})

In geometry, this polyhedron can be seen as either a polyhedral stellation or a compound.

== As a compound ==
It can be seen as the compound of an icosahedron and dodecahedron. It is one of four compounds constructed from a Platonic solid or Kepler-Poinsot solid, and its dual.

It has icosahedral symmetry (I_{h}) and the same vertex arrangement as a rhombic triacontahedron.

This can be seen as the three-dimensional equivalent of the compound of two pentagons ({10/2} "decagram"); this series continues into the fourth dimension as the compound of 120-cell and 600-cell and into higher dimensions as compounds of hyperbolic tilings.

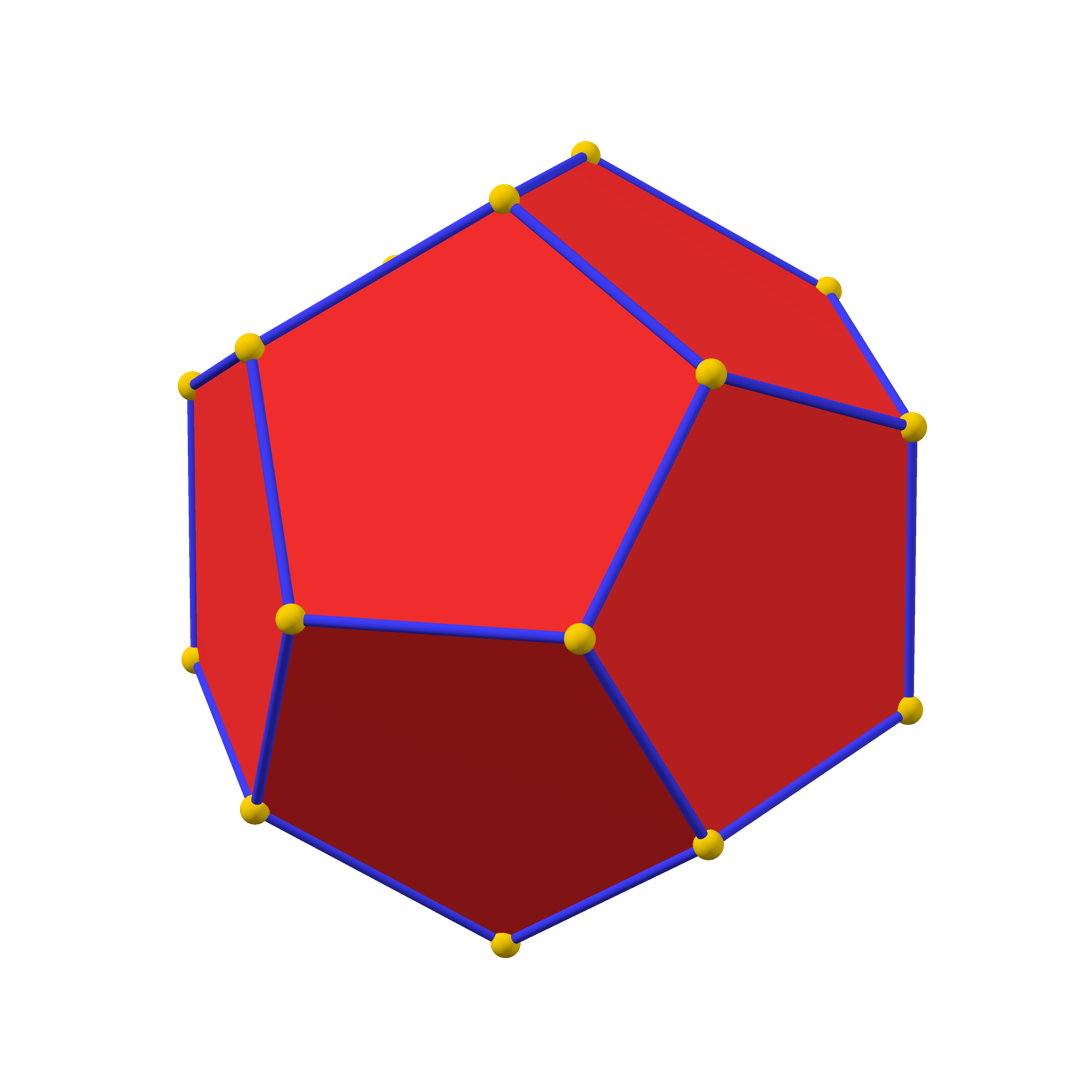
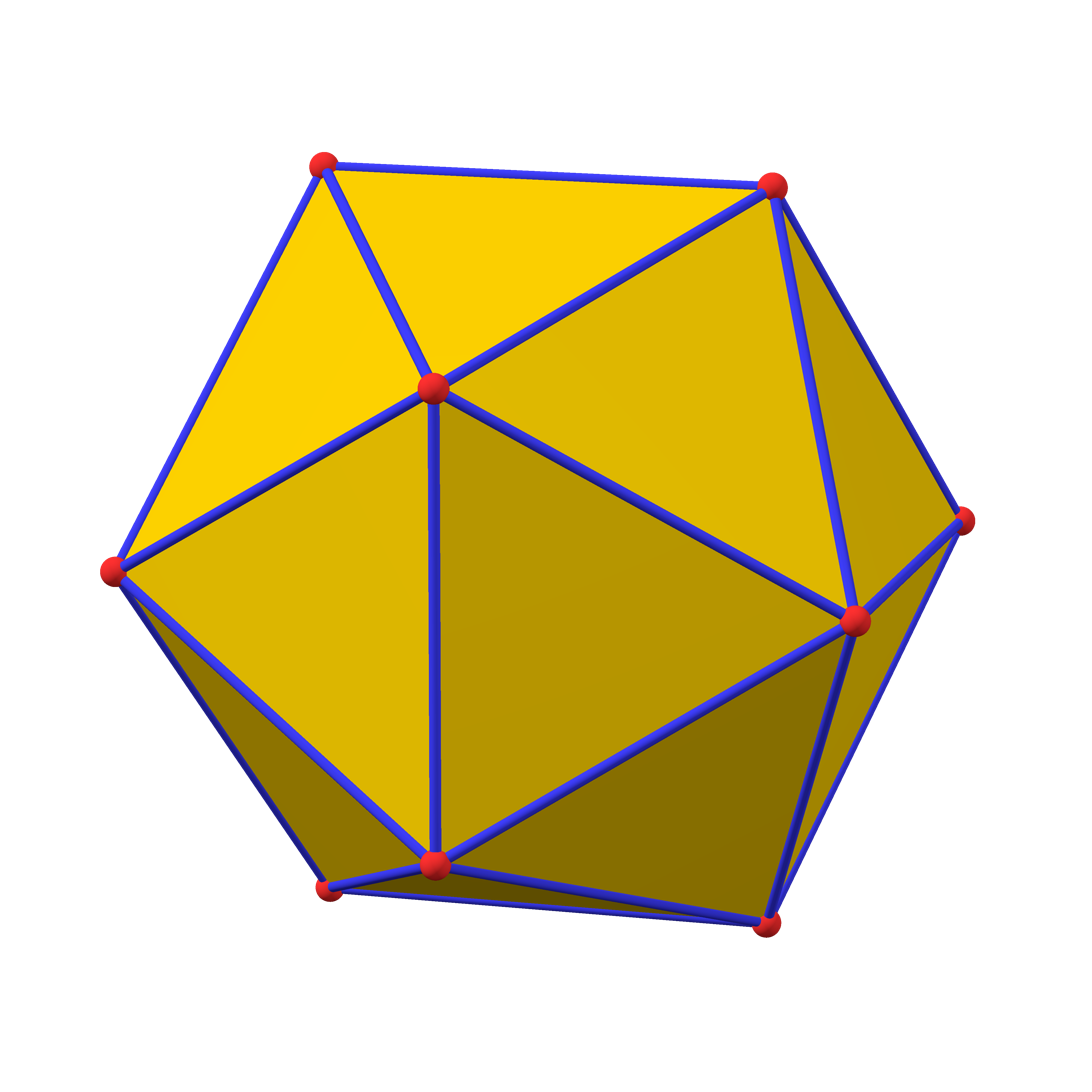
A dodecahedron and its dual icosahedron

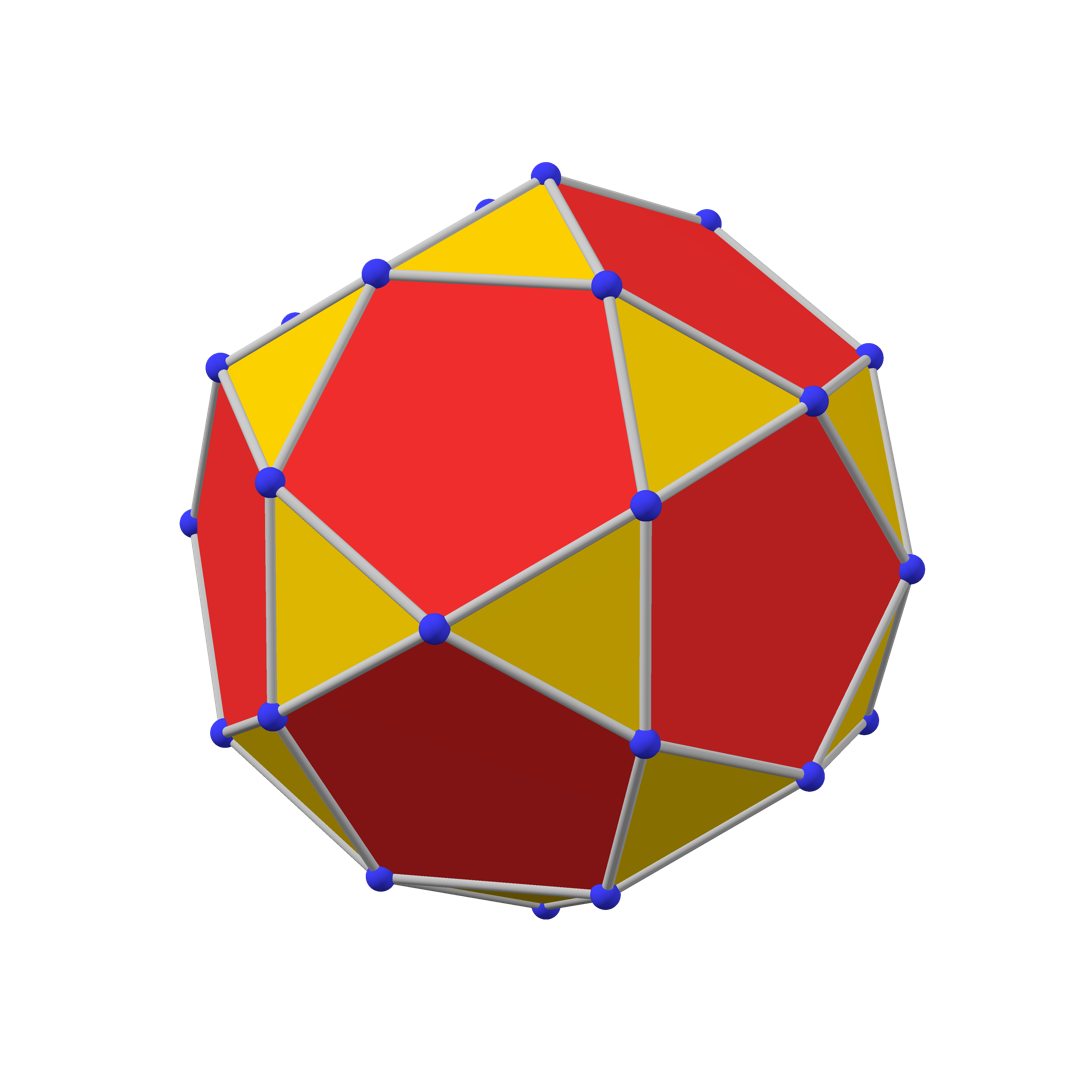
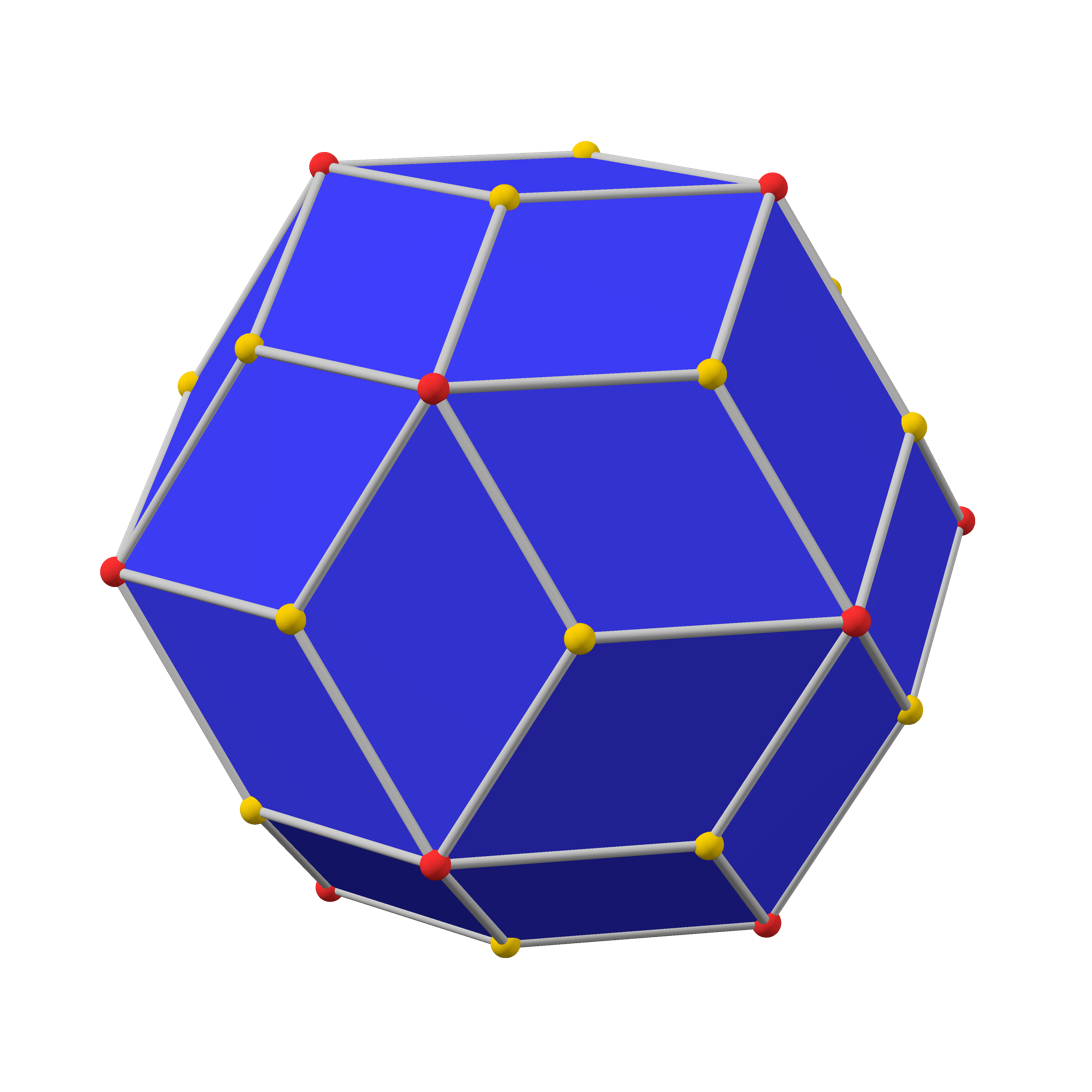
The intersection of both solids is the icosidodecahedron, and their convex hull is the rhombic triacontahedron.

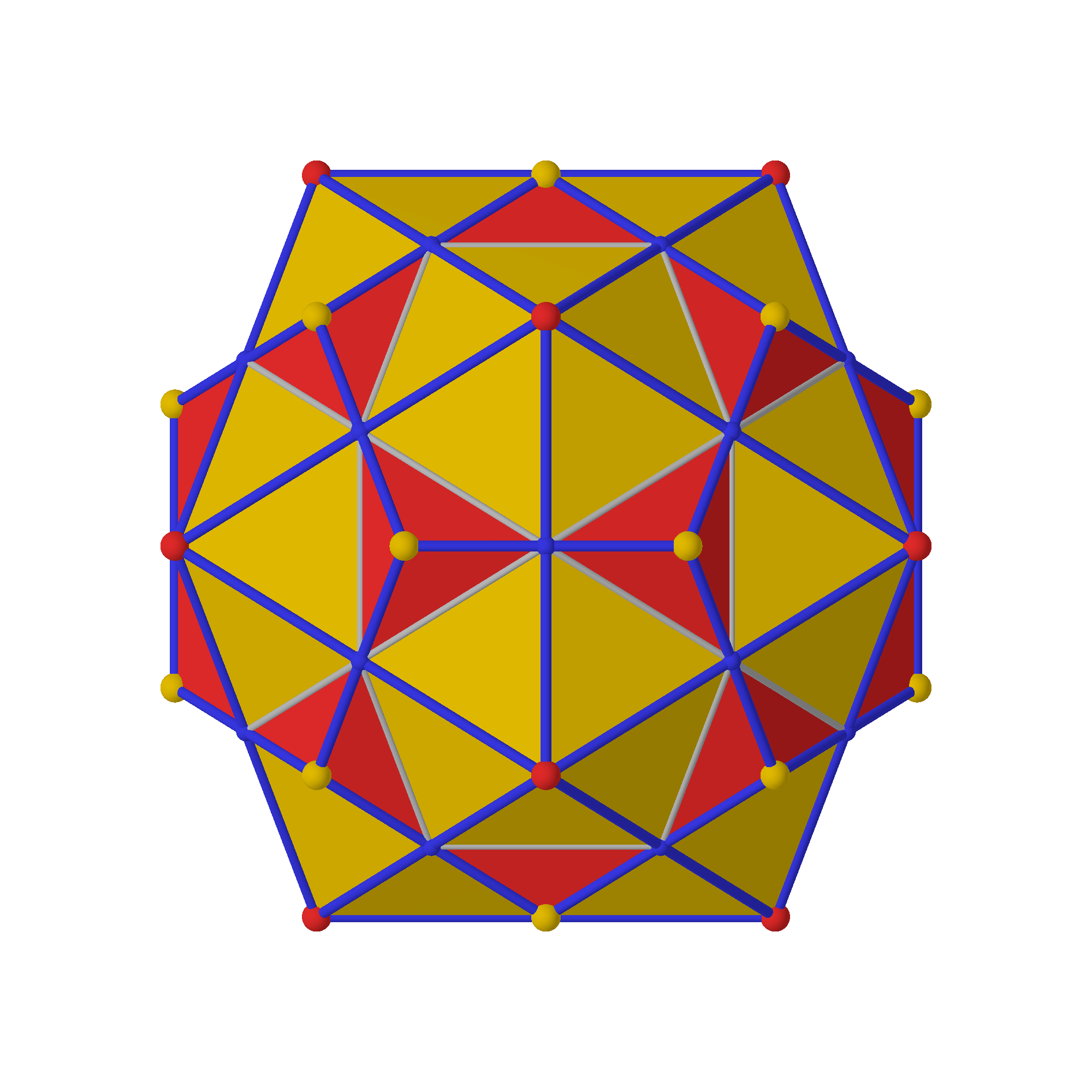
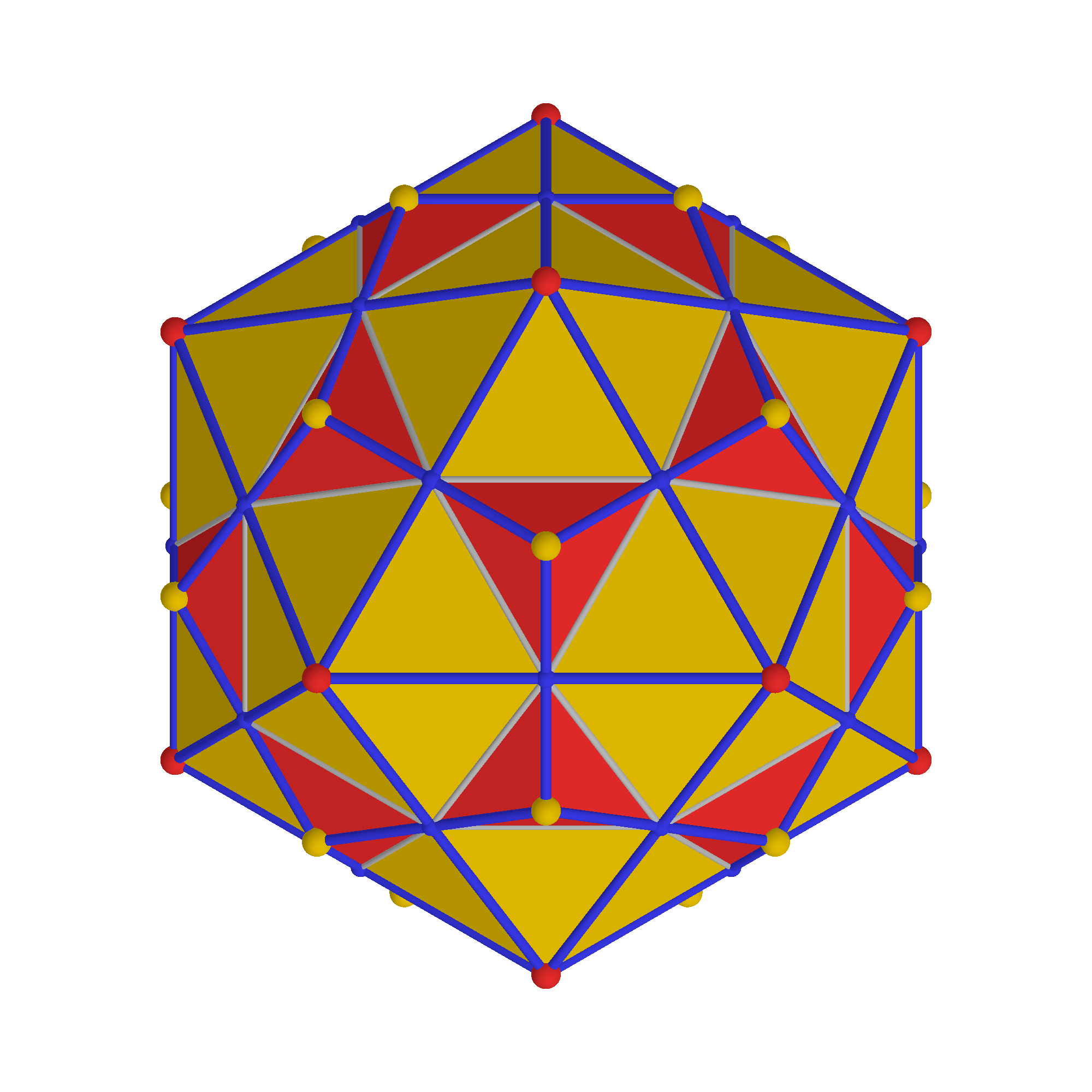
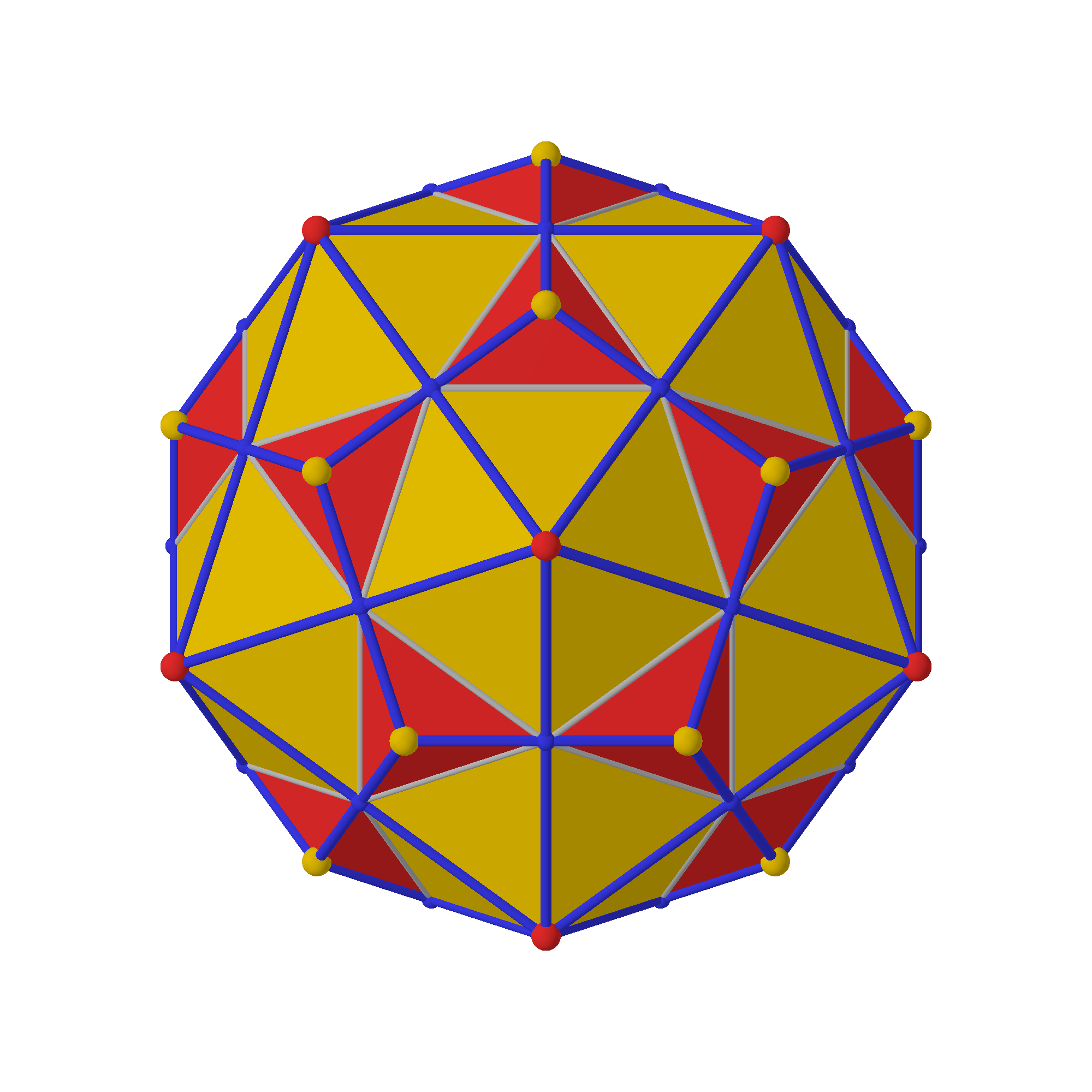
Seen from 2-fold, 3-fold and 5-fold symmetry axes
The decagon on the right is the Petrie polygon of both solids.
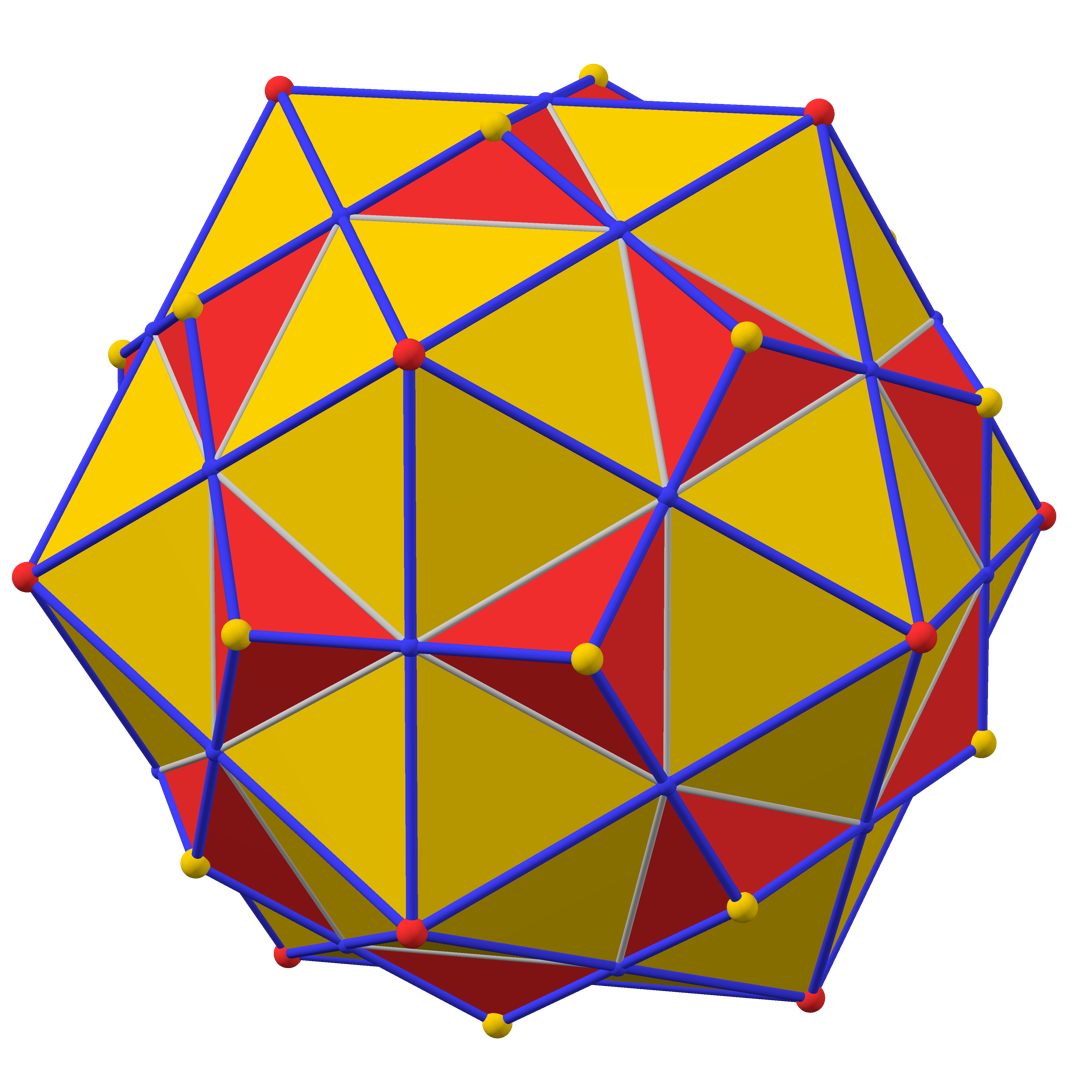
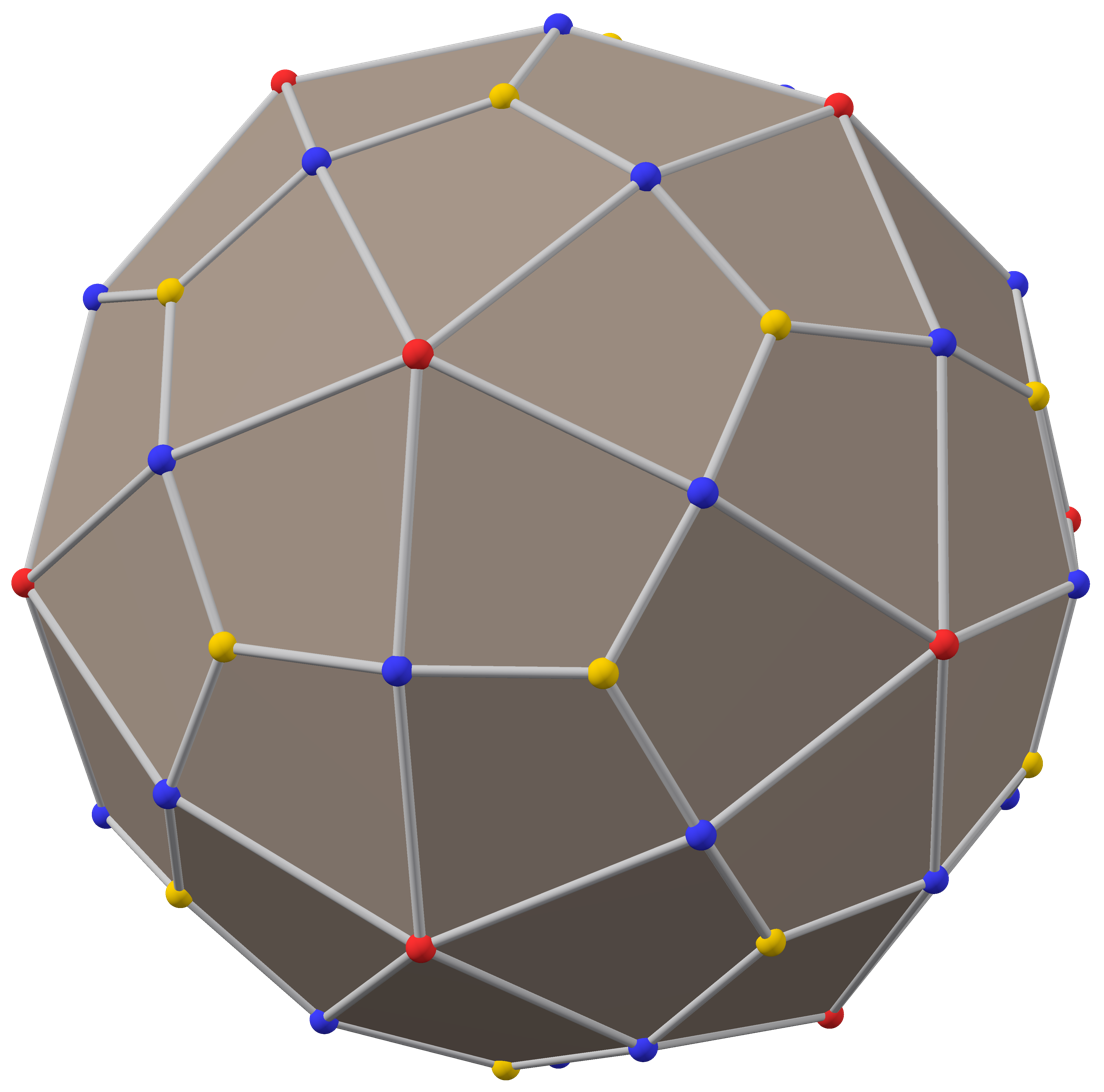
If the edge crossings were vertices, the mapping on a sphere would be the same as that of a deltoidal hexecontahedron.

== As a stellation ==
This polyhedron is the first stellation of the icosidodecahedron, and given as Wenninger model index 47.

The stellation facets for construction are:

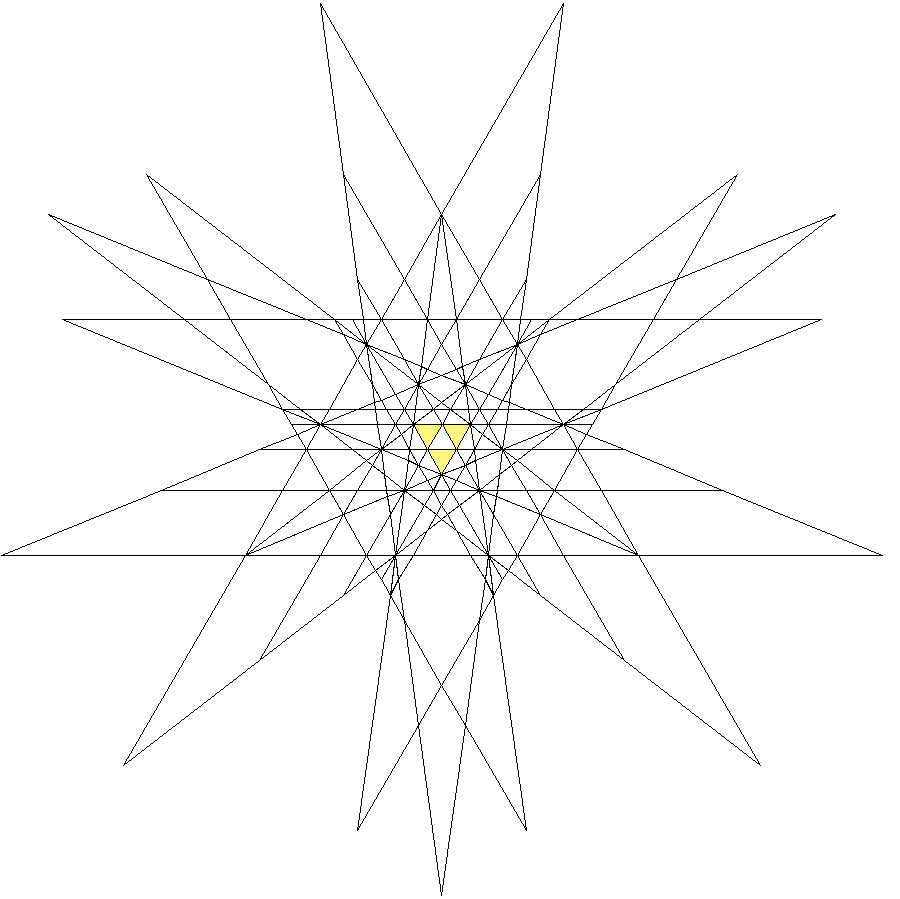
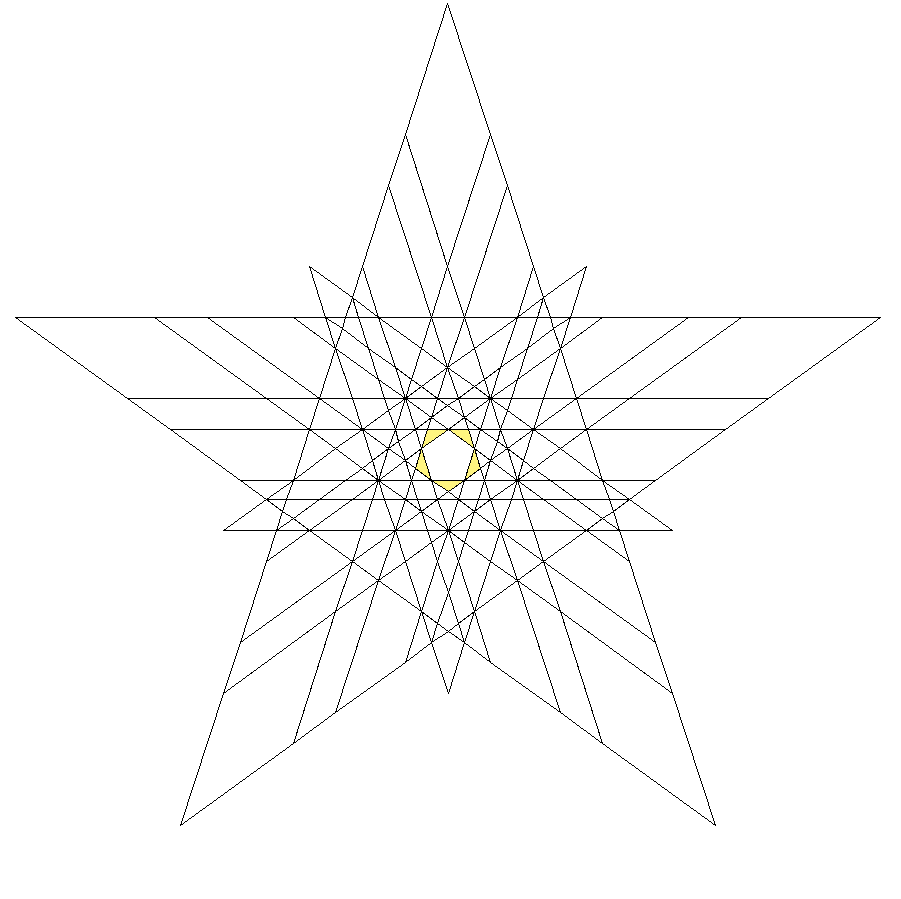
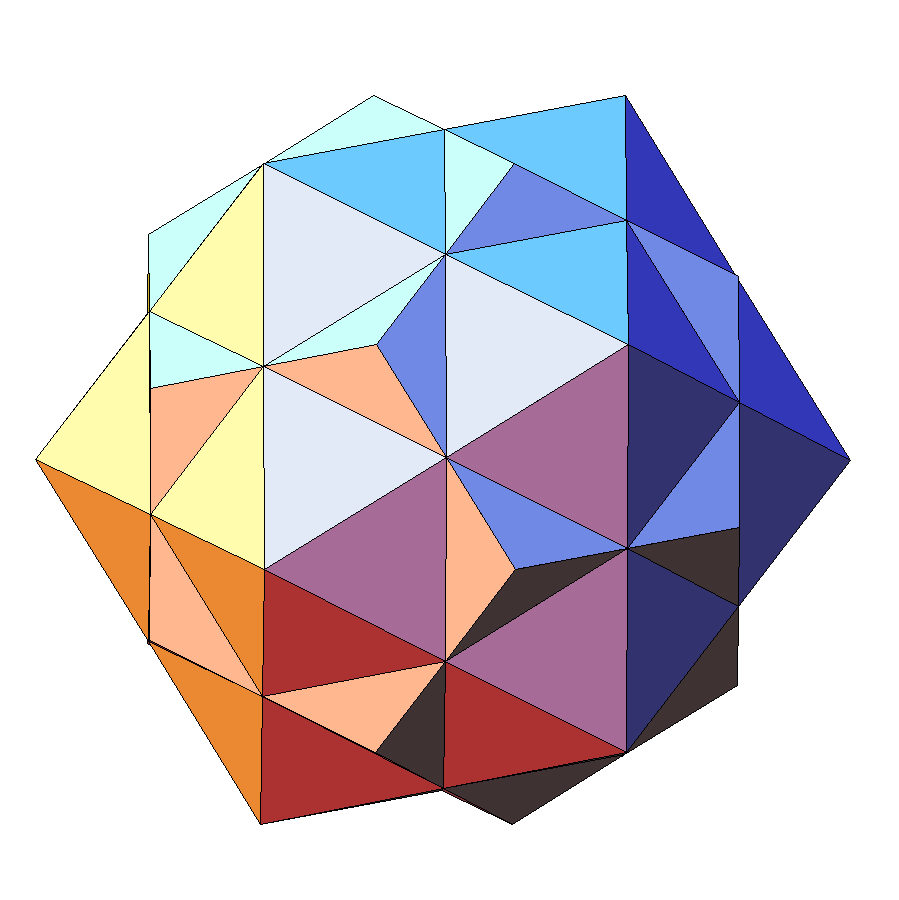

== As a Faceting ==
The compound of a Dodecahedron and an Icosahedron shares the same vertices as a list of other polyhedra, including the Rhombic triacontahedron and the Small triambic icosahedron.

== In popular culture ==
In the film Tron (1982), the character Bit took this shape when not speaking.

In the cartoon series Steven Universe (2013-2019), Steven's shield bubble, briefly used in the episode Change Your Mind, had this shape.

== See also ==
- Compound of two tetrahedra
- Compound of cube and octahedron
- Compound of small stellated dodecahedron and great dodecahedron
- Compound of great stellated dodecahedron and great icosahedron
