= Hexecontahedron =

Polyhedron with 60 faces

Pentakis dodecahedron	Deltoidal hexecontahedron
Pentagonal hexecontahedron	Triakis icosahedron
Rhombic hexecontahedron	Small hexagonal hexecontahedron

In geometry, a hexecontahedron (or hexacontahedron) is a polyhedron with 60 faces. There are many symmetric forms, and the ones with highest symmetry have icosahedral symmetry:

Four Catalan solids, convex:

- Pentakis dodecahedron - isosceles triangles
- Deltoidal hexecontahedron - kites
- Pentagonal hexecontahedron - pentagons
- Triakis icosahedron - isosceles triangles

Concave

- Rhombic hexecontahedron - rhombi

27 uniform star-polyhedral duals: (self-intersecting)

- Small dodecicosacron, Great dodecicosacron
- Small rhombidodecacron, Great rhombidodecacron
- Small dodecacronic hexecontahedron, Great dodecacronic hexecontahedron
- Rhombicosacron
- Small icosacronic hexecontahedron, Medial icosacronic hexecontahedron, Great icosacronic hexecontahedron
- Small stellapentakis dodecahedron, Great stellapentakis dodecahedron
- Great pentakis dodecahedron
- Great triakis icosahedron
- Small ditrigonal dodecacronic hexecontahedron, Great ditrigonal dodecacronic hexecontahedron
- Medial deltoidal hexecontahedron, Great deltoidal hexecontahedron
- Medial pentagonal hexecontahedron, Great pentagonal hexecontahedron
- Medial inverted pentagonal hexecontahedron, Great inverted pentagonal hexecontahedron
- Great pentagrammic hexecontahedron
- Small hexagonal hexecontahedron, Medial hexagonal hexecontahedron, Great hexagonal hexecontahedron
- Small hexagrammic hexecontahedron
