= Snub rhombicuboctahedron =

Snub rhombicuboctahedron
| Schläfli symbol | srr{4,3} = $sr\begin{Bmatrix} 4 \\ 3 \end{Bmatrix}$ |
| Conway notation | saC |
| Faces | 74: 8+48 {3} 6+12 {4} |
| Edges | 120 |
| Vertices | 48 |
| Symmetry group | O, [4,3]^{+}, (432) order 24 |
| Dual polyhedron | Pentagonal tetracontoctahedron |
| Properties | convex, chiral |

The snub rhombicuboctahedron is a polyhedron, constructed as a truncated rhombicuboctahedron. It has 74 faces: 18 squares, and 56 triangles. It can also be called the Conway snub cuboctahedron in but will be confused with the Coxeter snub cuboctahedron, the snub cube. See snub cuboctahedron.

== Related polyhedra ==
The snub rhombicuboctahedron can be seen in sequence of operations from the cuboctahedron.

| Name | Cubocta- hedron | Truncated cubocta- hedron | Snub cubocta- hedron | Truncated rhombi- cubocta- hedron | Snub rhombi- cubocta- hedron |
| Coxeter | CO (rC) | tCO (trC) | sCO (srC) | trCO (trrC) | srCO (htrrC) |
| Conway | aC | taC = bC | sC | taaC = baC | saC |
|---|---|---|---|---|---|
| Image | | | | | |
| Conway | jC | mC | gC | maC | gaC |
| Dual | | | | | |

== See also ==
- Expanded cuboctahedron
- Truncated rhombicosidodecahedron
