= Rhombidodecahedron =

Rhombidodecahedron may refer to:

- Great rhombidodecahedron
- Small rhombidodecahedron

== See also ==
- Rhombic dodecahedron
