= U37 =

U37 may refer to:

- German submarine U-37, various vessels
- Small nucleolar RNA SNORD37
- Truncated great dodecahedron
