= Expanded icosidodecahedron =

Type of polyhedron

Expanded icosidodecahedron
Schläfli symbol	rr$\begin{Bmatrix} 5 \\ 3 \end{Bmatrix}$ = rrr{5,3}
Conway notation	edaD = aaaD
Faces	122: 20 {3} 60 {4} 12 {5} 30 rhombs
Edges	240
Vertices	120
Symmetry group	I_{h}, [5,3], (*532) order 120
Rotation group	I, [5,3]^{+}, (532), order 60
Dual polyhedron	Deltoidal hecatonicosahedron
Properties	convex
Net

The expanded icosidodecahedron is a polyhedron, constructed as an expanded icosidodecahedron. It has 122 faces: 20 triangles, 60 squares, 12 pentagons, and 30 rhombs. The 120 vertices exist at two sets of 60, with a slightly different distance from its center.

It can also be constructed as a rectified rhombicosidodecahedron.

== Other names ==
- Expanded rhombic triacontahedron
- Rectified rhombicosidodecahedron
- Rectified small rhombicosidodecahedron
- Rhombirhombicosidodecahedron

== Expansion ==
The expansion operation from the rhombic triacontahedron can be seen in this animation:

== Dissection ==
This polyhedron can be dissected into a central rhombic triacontahedron surrounded by: 30 rhombic prisms, 20 tetrahedra, 12 pentagonal pyramids, 60 triangular prisms.

== Related polyhedra ==
Name	Dodeca- hedron	Icosidodeca- hedron	Rhomb- icosidodeca- hedron	Expanded icosidodeca- hedron
Coxeter	D	ID	rID	rrID
Conway	D	aD	aaD = eD	aaaD = eaD
Image				
Conway	dD = I	daD = jD	deD = oD	deaD = oaD
Dual				

== See also ==
- Rhombicosidodecahedron (expanded dodecahedron)
- Truncated rhombicosidodecahedron
- Expanded cuboctahedron
