= W72 =

W72 may refer to:

- W72 (nuclear warhead)
- Horonobe Station, in Hokkaido, Japan
- Small dodecicosidodecahedron
- W72, a Pontiac V8 engine
