= Great rhombicosidodecahedron =

Great rhombicosidodecahedron may refer to the following polyhedra:

- Truncated icosidodecahedron, Schläfli symbol t_{0,1,2}{5,3}
- Nonconvex great rhombicosidodecahedron, Schläfli symbol t_{0,2}{5/3,3}.
