= Compound of six pentagrammic prisms =

Polyhedral compound

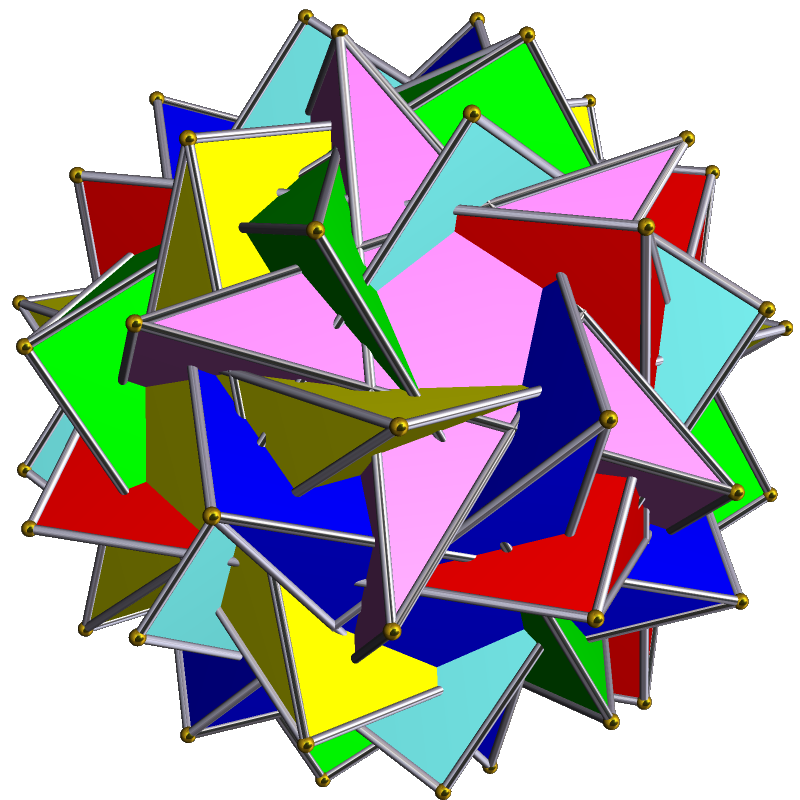
Compound of six pentagrammic prisms
Type	Uniform compound
Index	UC_{36}
Polyhedra	6 pentagrammic prisms
Faces	12 pentagrams, 30 squares
Edges	90
Vertices	60
Symmetry group	chiral icosahedral (I)
Subgroup restricting to one constituent	5-fold dihedral (D_{5})

This uniform polyhedron compound is a chiral symmetric arrangement of 6 pentagrammic prisms, aligned with the axes of fivefold rotational symmetry of a dodecahedron.

== Related polyhedra ==
This compound shares its vertex arrangement with four uniform polyhedra as follows:

Rhombicosidodecahedron	Small dodecicosidodecahedron	Small rhombidodecahedron
Small stellated truncated dodecahedron	Compound of six pentagrammic prisms	Compound of twelve pentagrammic prisms
