= Rhombic hexecontahedron =

3D geometric shape

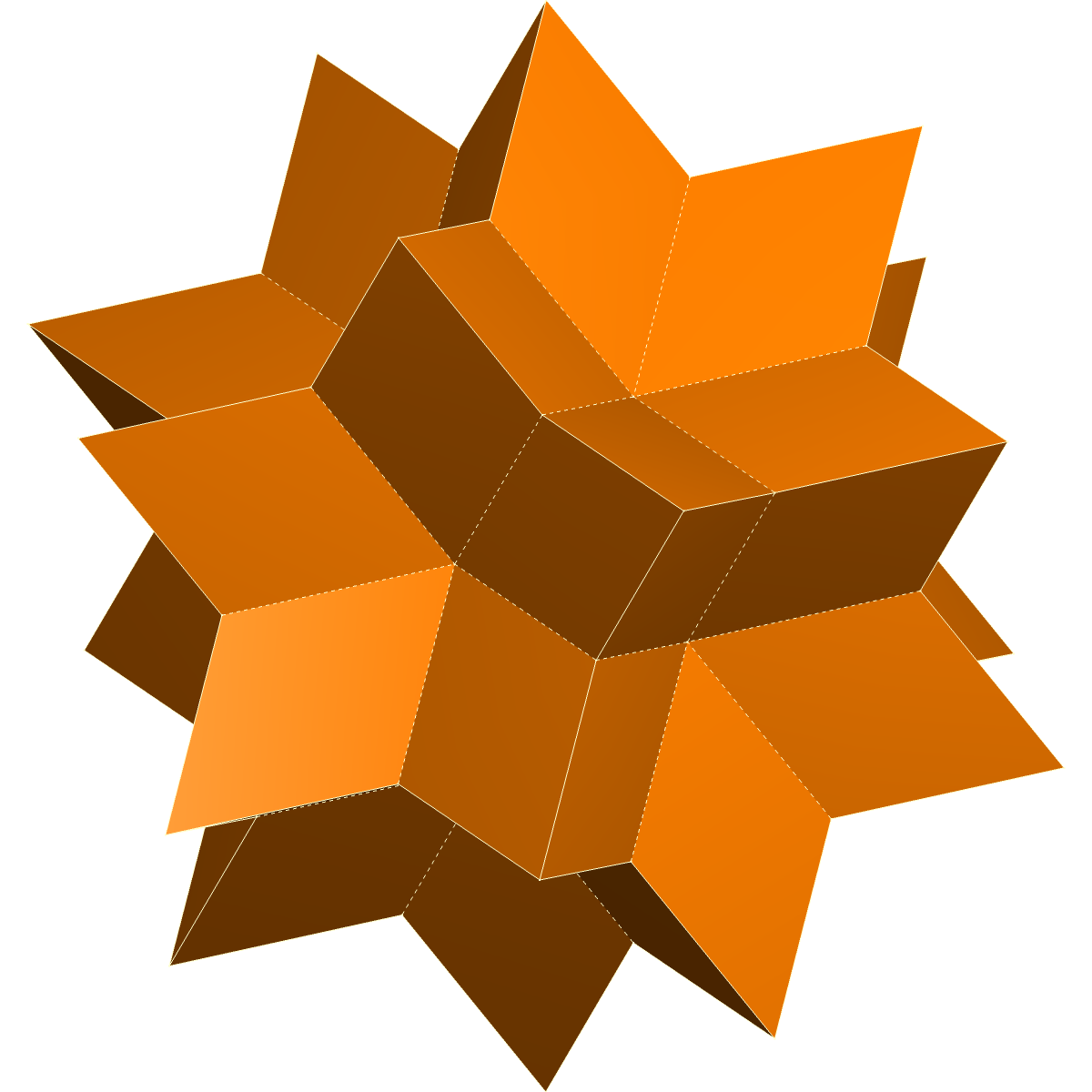
Rhombic hexecontahedron
Type	Stellation of rhombic triacontahedron
Vertices	62 (12+20+30)
Edges	120 (60+60)
Faces	60 golden rhombi
Symmetry	I_{h}, [5,3], (*532)
Properties	non-convex, zonohedron

3D model of a rhombic hexecontahedron

In geometry, a rhombic hexecontahedron is a stellation of the rhombic triacontahedron. It is nonconvex with 60 golden rhombic faces with icosahedral symmetry. It was described mathematically in 1940 by Helmut Unkelbach.

It is topologically identical to the convex deltoidal hexecontahedron which has kite faces.

== Dissection ==
The rhombic hexecontahedron can be dissected into 20 acute golden rhombohedra meeting at a central point. This gives the volume of a hexecontahedron of side length a to be $V = (10 + 2\sqrt 5)a^3$ and the area to be $A = (24\sqrt 5)a^2$.

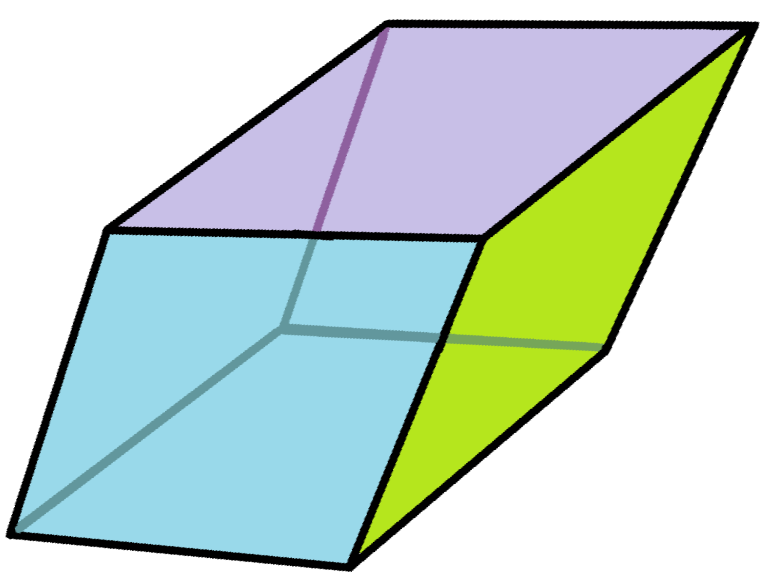

== Construction ==
A rhombic hexecontahedron can be constructed from a rhombic triacontahedron.

A rhombic hexecontahedron can be constructed from a regular dodecahedron, by taking its vertices, its face centers and its edge centers and scaling them in or out from the body center to different extents. Thus, if the 20 vertices of a dodecahedron are pulled out to increase the circumradius by a factor of (φ + 1)/2 ≈ 1.309, the 12 face centers are pushed in to decrease the inradius to (3 − φ)/2 ≈ 0.691 of its original value, and the 30 edge centers are left unchanged, then a rhombic hexecontahedron is formed. (The circumradius is increased by 30.9% and the inradius is decreased by the same 30.9%.) Scaling the points by different amounts results in hexecontahedra with kite-shaped faces or other polyhedra.

Every golden rhombic face has a face center, a vertex, and two edge centers of the original dodecahedron, with the edge centers forming the short diagonal. Each edge center is connected to two vertices and two face centers. Each face center is connected to five edge centers, and each vertex is connected to three edge centers.

== Stellation ==
The rhombic hexecontahedron is one of 227 self-supporting stellations of the rhombic triacontahedron. Its stellation diagram looks like this, with the original rhombic triacontahedron faces as the central rhombus.

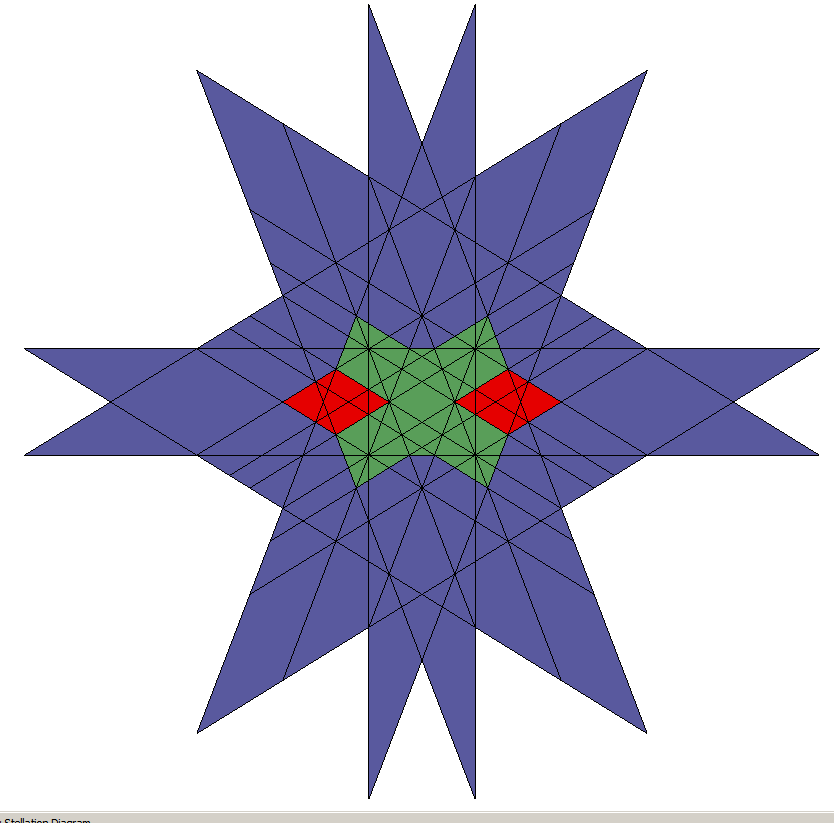

== Related polyhedra ==
The great rhombic triacontahedron contains the 30 larger intersecting rhombic faces:

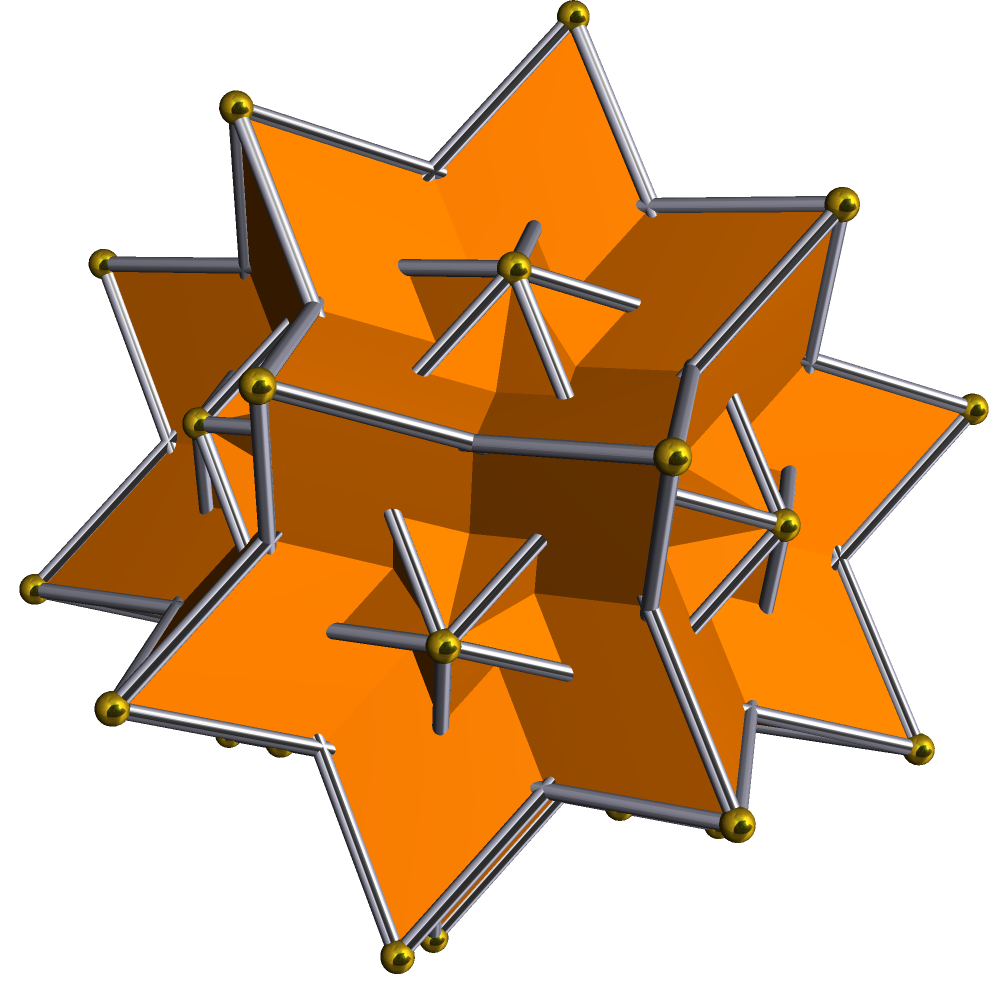
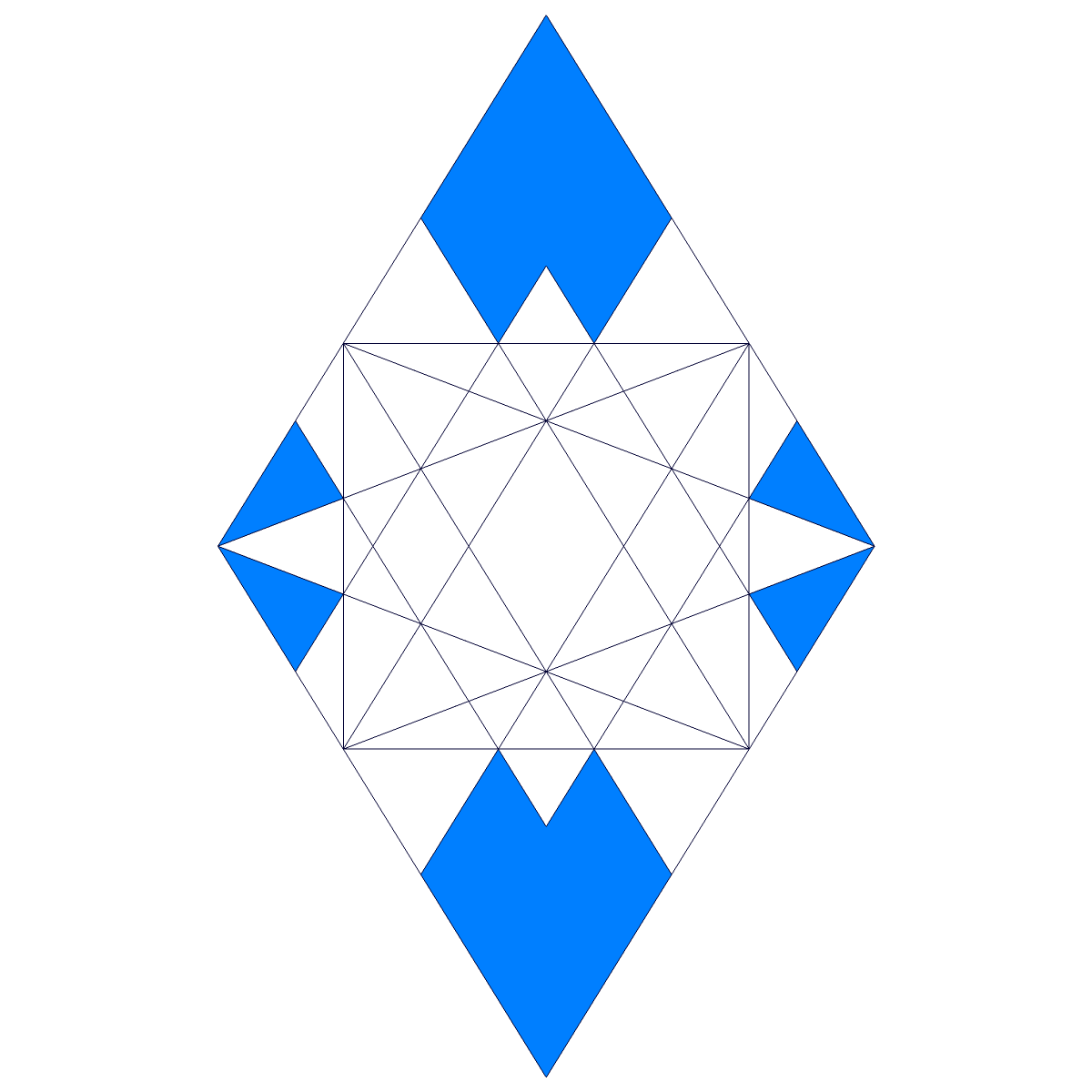

== In popular culture ==
In Brazilian culture, handcrafted rhombic hexecontahedra used to be made from colored fabric and cardboard, called giramundos ("world turners" in Portuguese) or happiness stars, sewn by mothers and given as wedding gifts to their daughters. The custom got lost with the urbanization of Brazil, though the technique for producing the handicrafts was still taught in Brazilian rural schools up until the first half of the twentieth century.

The logo of the WolframAlpha website is a red rhombic hexecontahedron and was inspired by the logo of the related Mathematica software.

== Bibliography ==
- Unkelbach, H. "Die kantensymmetrischen, gleichkantigen Polyeder". Deutsche Math. 5, 306-316, 1940.
- Grünbaum, B. (1996a). "A New Rhombic Hexecontahedron". Geombinatorics: 15–18.
- Grünbaum, B. (1996b). "A New Rhombic Hexecontahedron—Once More". Geombinatorics: 55–59.
- Grünbaum, B. (1997). "Still More Rhombic Hexecontahedra". Geombinatorics: 140–142.
- Grünbaum, B. Parallelogram-Faced Isohedra with Edges in Mirror-Planes. Discrete Math. 221, 93–100, 2000.
