= Great dodecicosidodecahedron =

Polyhedron with 44 faces

Great dodecicosidodecahedron
Type	Uniform star polyhedron
Elements	F = 44, E = 120; V = 60 (χ = −16)
Faces by sides	20{3}+12{5/2}+12{10/3}
Coxeter diagram	
Wythoff symbol	5/2 3 | 5/3; 5/3 3/2 | 5/3
Symmetry group	I_{h}, [5,3], *532
Index references	U_{61}, C_{77}, W_{99}
Dual polyhedron	Great dodecacronic hexecontahedron
Vertex figure	3.10/3.5/2.10/7
Bowers acronym	Gaddid

3D model of a great dodecicosidodecahedron.

In geometry, the great dodecicosidodecahedron (or great dodekicosidodecahedron) is a nonconvex uniform polyhedron, indexed as U_{61}. It has 44 faces (20 triangles, 12 pentagrams and 12 decagrams), 120 edges and 60 vertices.

== Related polyhedra ==
It shares its vertex arrangement with the truncated great dodecahedron and the uniform compounds of 6 or 12 pentagonal prisms. It additionally shares its edge arrangement with the nonconvex great rhombicosidodecahedron (having the triangular and pentagrammic faces in common), and with the great rhombidodecahedron (having the decagrammic faces in common).

Nonconvex great rhombicosidodecahedron	Great dodecicosidodecahedron	Great rhombidodecahedron
Truncated great dodecahedron	Compound of six pentagonal prisms	Compound of twelve pentagonal prisms

== See also ==
- List of uniform polyhedra
