= Nonconvex great rhombicosidodecahedron =

Polyhedron with 62 faces

Nonconvex great rhombicosidodecahedron
Type	Uniform star polyhedron
Elements	F = 62, E = 120; V = 60 (χ = 2)
Faces by sides	20{3}+30{4}+12{5/2}
Coxeter diagram	
Wythoff symbol	5/3 3 | 2; 5/2 3/2 | 2
Symmetry group	I_{h}, [5,3], *532
Index references	U_{67}, C_{84}, W_{105}
Dual polyhedron	Great deltoidal hexecontahedron
Vertex figure	3.4.5/3.4
Bowers acronym	Qrid

3D model of a nonconvex great rhombicosidodecahedron

In geometry, the nonconvex great rhombicosidodecahedron is a nonconvex uniform polyhedron, indexed as U_{67}. It has 62 faces (20 triangles, 30 squares and 12 pentagrams), 120 edges, and 60 vertices. It is also called the quasirhombicosidodecahedron. It is given a Schläfli symbol rr{5/3,3}. Its vertex figure is a crossed quadrilateral.

This model shares the name with the convex great rhombicosidodecahedron, also known as the truncated icosidodecahedron.

== Cartesian coordinates ==
Cartesian coordinates for the vertices of a nonconvex great rhombicosidodecahedron are all the even permutations of
$$\begin{array}{ccclc}
\Bigl(& \pm\,\frac{1}{\varphi^2},& 0,& \pm \bigl[2-\frac{1}{\varphi}\bigr] &\Bigr) \\
\Bigl(& \pm\,1,& \pm\,\frac{1}{\varphi^3},& \pm\,1 &\Bigr) \\
\Bigl(& \pm\,\frac{1}{\varphi},& \pm\,\frac{1}{\varphi^2},& \pm\,\frac{2}{\varphi} &\Bigr)
\end{array}$$

where $\varphi = \tfrac{1+\sqrt 5}{2}$ is the golden ratio.

== Related polyhedra ==
It shares its vertex arrangement with the truncated great dodecahedron, and with the uniform compounds of 6 or 12 pentagonal prisms. It additionally shares its edge arrangement with the great dodecicosidodecahedron (having the triangular and pentagrammic faces in common), and the great rhombidodecahedron (having the square faces in common).

Nonconvex great rhombicosidodecahedron	Great dodecicosidodecahedron	Great rhombidodecahedron
Truncated great dodecahedron	Compound of six pentagonal prisms	Compound of twelve pentagonal prisms

=== Great deltoidal hexecontahedron ===
Great deltoidal hexecontahedron
Type	Star polyhedron
Face	
Elements	F = 60, E = 120; V = 62 (χ = 2)
Symmetry group	I_{h}, [5,3], *532
Index references	DU_{67}
dual polyhedron	Nonconvex great rhombicosidodecahedron

3D model of a great deltoidal hexecontahedron

The great deltoidal hexecontahedron is a nonconvex isohedral polyhedron. It is the dual of the nonconvex great rhombicosidodecahedron. It is visually identical to the great rhombidodecacron. It has 60 intersecting cross quadrilateral faces, 120 edges, and 62 vertices.

It is also called a great strombic hexecontahedron.

== See also ==
- List of uniform polyhedra
