= Zometool =

Construction set toy

Zometool is a construction set toy that had been created by a collaboration of Steve Baer (the creator of Zome architecture), artist Clark Richert, Paul Hildebrandt (the present CEO of Zometool), and co-inventor Marc Pelletier. It is manufactured by Zometool, Inc. According to the company, Zometool was primarily designed for kids. Zometool has also been used in other fields including mathematics and physics. For example, aperiodic tilings such as Penrose tilings can be modeled using Zometool. The learning tool was designed by inventor-designer Steve Baer, his wife Holly, and others.

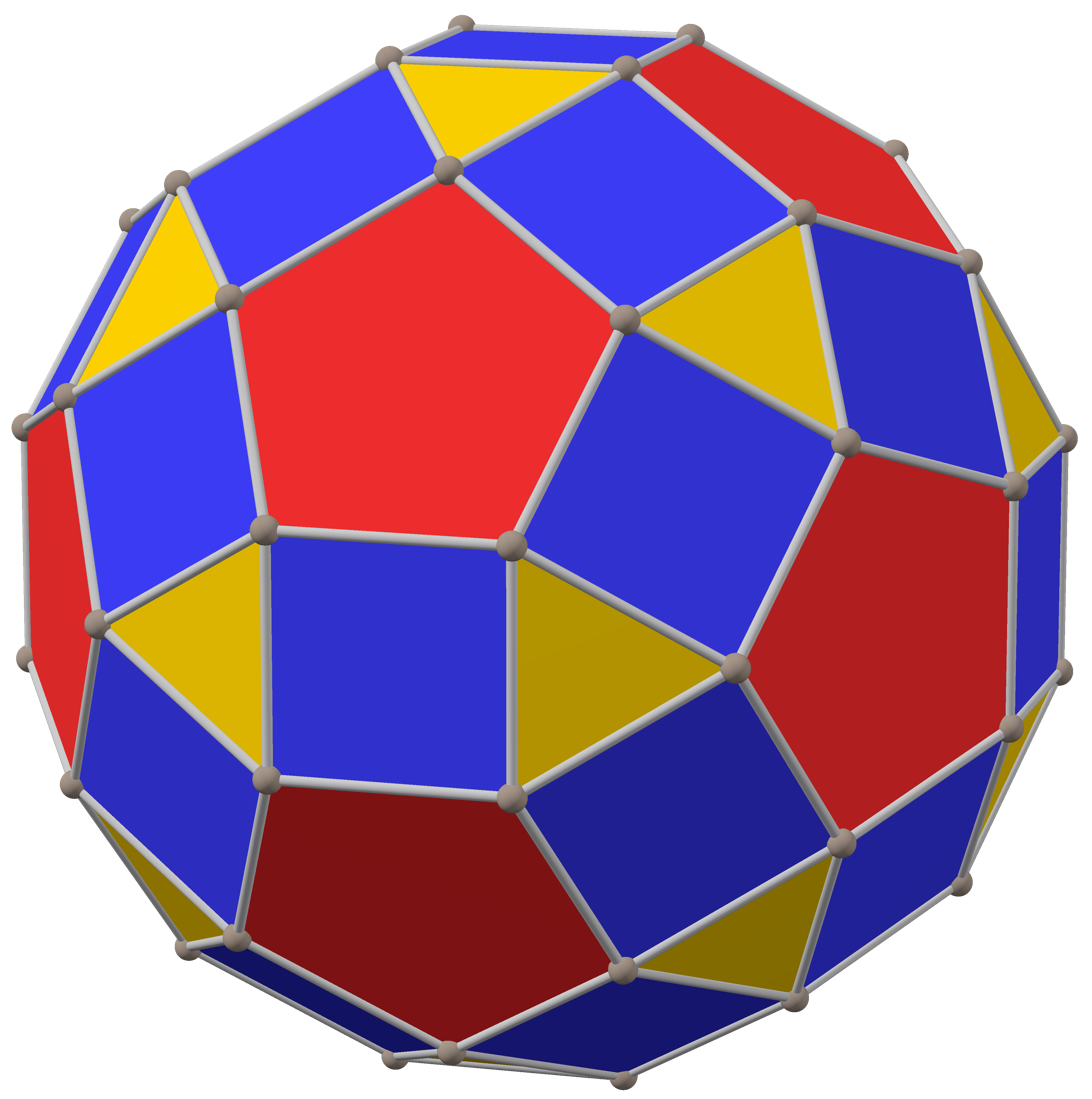
Rhombicosidodecahedron

The Zometool plastic construction set toy is produced by a privately owned company of the same name, based outside of Longmont, Colorado, and which evolved out of Baer's company ZomeWorks. Its elements consist of small connector nodes and struts of various colors. The overall shape of a connector node is that of a non-uniform small rhombicosidodecahedron with each face replaced by a small hole. The ends of the struts are designed to fit in the holes of the connector nodes, allowing for syntheses of a variety of structures. The idea of shape-coding the three types of struts was developed by Marc Pelletier and Paul Hildebrandt. To create the "balls", or nodes, Pelletier and Hildebrandt invented a system of 62 hydraulic pins that came together to form a mold. The first connector node emerged from their mold on April 1, 1992.

In the years since 1992, Zometool has extended its product line, though the basic design of the connector node has not changed so all parts to date are compatible with each-other. From 1992 until 2000, Zometool produced kits with connector nodes and blue, yellow, and red struts. In 2000, Zometool introduced green struts, prompted by French architect Fabien Vienne, which can be used to construct the regular tetrahedron and octahedron. In 2003, Zometool changed the style of the struts slightly. The struts "with clicks" have a different surface texture and they also have longer nibs which allow for a more robust connection between connector node and strut.

== Characteristics ==
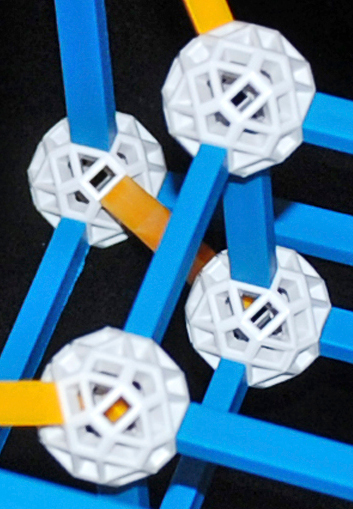
Zometool strut and ball

The color of a Zometool strut is associated with its cross section and also with the shape of the hole of the connector node in which it fits. Each blue strut has a rectangular cross section, each yellow strut has a triangular cross section, and each red strut has a pentagonal cross section. The cross section of a green strut is a rhombus of √2 aspect ratio, but as the connector nodes do not include holes at the required positions, the green struts instead fit into any of the 12 pentagonal holes with 5 possible orientations per hole, 60 possible orientations in all; using them is not as straightforward as the other struts.

At their midpoints, each of the yellow and red struts has a twist where the cross-sectional shape reverses. This design feature forces the connector nodes on the ends of the strut to have the same orientation. Similarly, the cross section of the blue strut is a non-square rectangle, again ensuring that the two nodes on the ends have the same orientation. Instead of a twist, the green struts have two bends which allow them to fit into the pentagonal holes of the connector node which are at a slight offset from the strut's axis.

Among other places, the word zome comes from the term zone. The zome system allows no more than 61 zones. The cross-sectional shapes correspond to colors, and in turn these correspond to zone colors. Hence the zome system has 15 blue zones, 10 yellow zones, 6 red zones, and 30 green zones. Two shapes are associated with blue. The blue struts with a rectangular cross section are designed to lie in the same zones as the blue struts, but they are half the length of a blue strut; hence these struts are often called "half-blue" (and were originally made in a light blue color). The blue-green struts with a rhombic cross section lie in the same zones as the green struts, but they are designed so that the ratio of a rhombic blue-green strut to a blue strut is 1:1 (as opposed to the green strut's √2:1). Due to this length ratio, the blue-green struts that have a rhombic cross section do not mathematically belong to the zome system.

== Mathematics of Zometools ==
The strut lengths follow a mathematical pattern: For any color, there exists lengths such that they increase by a constant factor of approximately 1.618, a number that is yield of what is called the "golden ratio" which is represented by Greek letter phi ($\varphi$ or $\phi$). The golden ratio is a ratio such that the sum of two quantities is equal to the ratio of the same quantities, based on the largest value of the two numbers.

Thus,

$\frac{a+b}{a} = \frac{a}{b} = \varphi$

An application of the golden ratio for the zome system is that for each color,

there exists a length such that a long strut length equals the length of a medium strut connected to a short strut.

In other words, the length of the long strut equals the sum of the medium strut length and the a short strut length.

== Definition ==
A zome is defined in terms of the vector space $\R^3$, equipped with the standard inner product, also known as 3-dimensional Euclidean space.

Let $\varphi$ denote the golden ratio and let $H_3$ denote the symmetry group of the configuration of vectors $(0,\pm\varphi,\pm 1)$, $(\pm\varphi,\pm 1,0)$, and $(\pm 1,0,\pm\varphi)$. The group $H_3$, an example of a Coxeter group, is known as the icosahedral group because it is the symmetry group of a regular icosahedron having these vectors as its vertices. The subgroup of $H_3$ consisting of the elements with determinant 1 (i.e. the rotations) is isomorphic to $A_5$.

Define the "standard blue vectors" as the $A_5$-orbit of the vector $(2,0,0)$. Define the "standard yellow vectors" as the $A_5$-orbit of the vector $(1,1,1)$. Define the "standard red vectors" as the $A_5$-orbit of the vector $(0,\varphi,1)$. A "strut" of the zome system is any vector which can be obtained from the standard vectors described above by scaling by any power $\varphi^n$, where $n$ is an integer. A "node" of the zome system is any element of the subgroup of $\R^3$ generated by the struts. Finally, the "zome system" is the set of all pairs $(N,S)$, where $N$ is a set of nodes and $S$ is a set of pairs $(v,w)$ such that $v$ and $w$ are in $N$ and the difference $v-w$ is a strut.

There are then 30, 20, and 12 standard vectors having the colors blue, yellow, and red, respectively. Correspondingly, the stabilizer subgroup of a blue, yellow, or red strut is isomorphic to the cyclic group of order 2, 3, or 5, respectively. Hence, one may also describe the blue, yellow, and red struts as "rectangular", "triangular", and "pentagonal", respectively.

The zome system may be extended by adjoining green vectors. The "standard green vectors" comprise the $A_5$-orbit of the vector $(2,2,0)$ and a "green strut" as any vector which can be obtained by scaling a standard green vector by any integral power $\varphi^n$. As above, one may check that there are $|A_5|$=60 standard green vectors. One may then enhance the zome system by including these green struts. Doing this does not affect the set of nodes.

The abstract zome system defined above is significant because of the following fact: Every connected zome model has a faithful image in the zome system. The converse of this fact is only partially true, but this is due only to the laws of physics. For example, the radius of a zometool node is positive (as opposed to a node being a single point mathematically), so one cannot make a zometool model where two nodes are separated by an arbitrarily small, prescribed distance. Similarly, only a finite number of lengths of struts will ever be manufactured, and a green strut cannot be placed directly adjacent to a red strut or another green strut with which it shares the same hole (even though they are mathematically distinct).

== As a modeling system ==
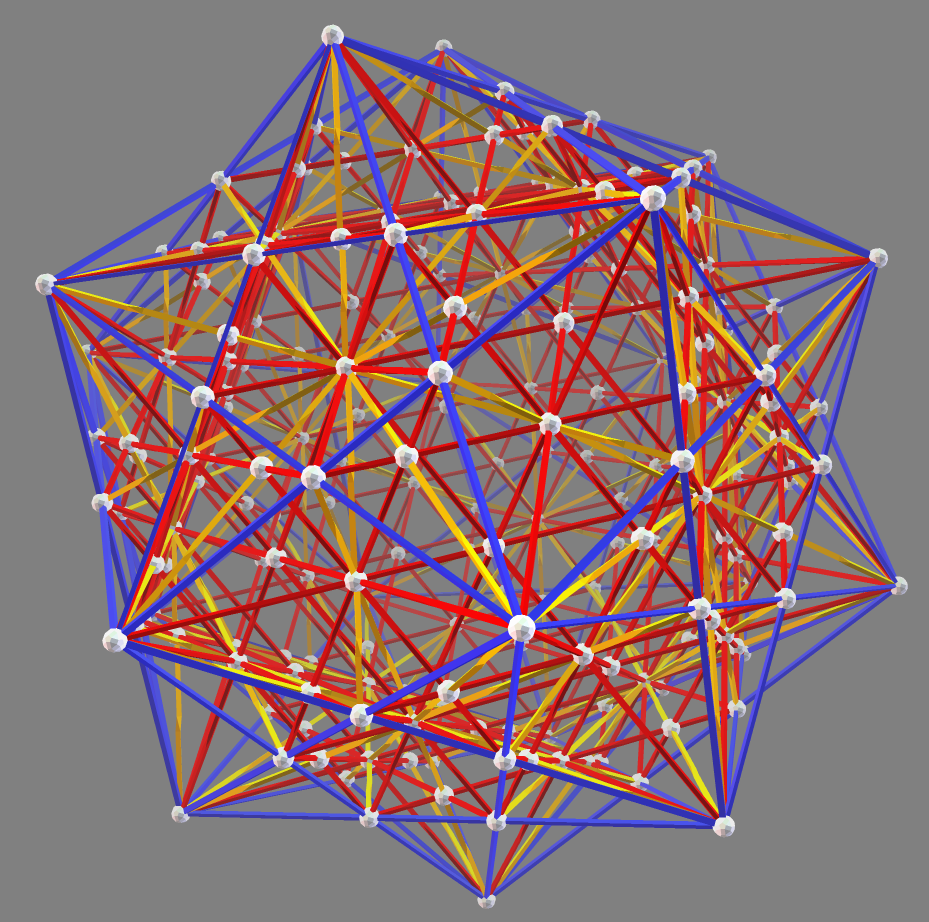
Compound of five cubes, rendered in ZomeCAD

Compound of five tetrahedra, rendered in vZome

The zome system is especially useful for modeling 1-dimensional skeletons of highly symmetric objects in 3- and 4-dimensional Euclidean space. The most prominent among these are the five Platonic Solids, and the 4-dimensional polytopes related to the 120-cell and the 600-cell. However, many other mathematical objects may be modeled using the zome system, including:

- Three of the four Kepler-Poinsot polyhedra
- Regular polyhedral compounds
- Regular 4-dimensional polytopes and some compounds
- Many stellations of the rhombic triacontahedron
- Many stellations of the regular icosahedron
- Zonohedra, especially the rhombic enneacontahedron and rhombic triacontahedron
- Hypercubes in dimensions 61 or fewer
- Most uniform polyhedra (a major exception being those formed using the snub operation)
- Many uniform 4-polytopes
- Thorold Gosset's exceptional semiregular polytopes in 6, 7, and 8 dimensions
- Some Johnson solids
- Desargues configuration
- Two of the Catalan solids
- Classical and exceptional root systems
- Triality (from Lie theory)

The uses of zome are not restricted to pure mathematics. Other uses include the study of engineering problems, especially steel-truss structures, the study of some molecular, nanotube, and viral structures, and to make soap film surfaces.

== See also ==
- Free Universal Construction Kit – 3D-printable open source construction toy
