= Compound of six pentagonal prisms =

Polyhedral compound

Compound of six pentagonal prisms
| Type | Uniform compound |
| Index | UC_{34} |
| Polyhedra | 6 pentagonal prisms |
| Faces | 12 pentagons, 30 squares |
| Edges | 90 |
| Vertices | 60 |
| Symmetry group | chiral icosahedral (I) |
| Subgroup restricting to one constituent | 5-fold dihedral (D_{5}) |

This uniform polyhedron compound is a chiral symmetric arrangement of six pentagonal prisms, aligned with the axes of fivefold rotational symmetry of a dodecahedron.

== Related polyhedra ==
This compound shares its vertex arrangement with four uniform polyhedra as follows:

| Nonconvex great rhombicosidodecahedron | Great dodecicosidodecahedron | Great rhombidodecahedron |
| Truncated great dodecahedron | Compound of six pentagonal prisms | Compound of twelve pentagonal prisms |
