= Compound of twelve pentagonal prisms =

Polyhedral compound

Compound of twelve pentagonal prisms
Type	Uniform compound
Index	UC_{35}
Polyhedra	12 pentagonal prisms
Faces	24 pentagons, 60 squares
Edges	180
Vertices	60
Symmetry group	icosahedral (I_{h})
Subgroup restricting to one constituent	5-fold dihedral (D_{5})

This uniform polyhedron compound is a symmetric arrangement of 12 pentagonal prisms, aligned in pairs with the axes of fivefold rotational symmetry of a dodecahedron.

It results from composing the two enantiomorphs of the compound of six pentagonal prisms. In doing so, the vertices of the two enantiomorphs coincide, with the result that the full compound has two pentagonal prisms incident on each of its vertices.

== Related polyhedra ==
This compound shares its vertex arrangement with four uniform polyhedra as follows:

Nonconvex great rhombicosidodecahedron	Great dodecicosidodecahedron	Great rhombidodecahedron
Truncated great dodecahedron	Compound of six pentagonal prisms	Compound of twelve pentagonal prisms
