= Truncated rhombicuboctahedron =

Type of polyhedron

Truncated rhombicuboctahedron
Schläfli symbol	trr{4,3} = $tr\begin{Bmatrix} 4 \\ 3 \end{Bmatrix}$
Conway notation	taaC
Faces	50: 24 {4} 8 {6} 6+12 {8}
Edges	144
Vertices	96
Symmetry group	O_{h}, [4,3], (*432) order 48
Rotation group	O, [4,3]^{+}, (432), order 24
Dual polyhedron	Disdyakis icositetrahedron
Properties	convex, zonohedron

The truncated rhombicuboctahedron—alternatively known as truncated small rhombicuboctahedron or beveled cuboctahedron—is a polyhedron, constructed from a rhombicuboctahedron by truncating its vertices. It has 50 faces consisting of 18 octagons, 8 hexagons, and 24 squares. It can fill space with the truncated cube, truncated tetrahedron and triangular prism as a truncated runcic cubic honeycomb.

== Zonohedron ==
As a zonohedron, it can be constructed with all but 12 octagons as regular polygons. It has two sets of 48 vertices existing on two distances from its center. It represents the Minkowski sum of a cube, a truncated octahedron, and a rhombic dodecahedron.

The Cartesian coordinates for a truncated rhombicuboctahedron is:
$$\begin{align}
\left(1,\pm 1,0\right), &\quad \left(1,0,\pm 1\right), \quad \left(0,1,\pm 1\right), \\
\left(\sqrt{\frac{2}{3}},\pm \sqrt{\frac{2}{3}},\pm \sqrt{\frac{2}{3}}\right), &\quad \left(\sqrt{2},0,0\right), \\
\left(0,\sqrt{2},0\right), &\quad \left(0,0,\sqrt{2}\right)
\end{align}$$

== Excavated truncated rhombicuboctahedron ==
The excavated truncated rhombicuboctahedron is a toroidal polyhedron, constructed from a truncated rhombicuboctahedron with its 12 irregular octagonal faces removed. It comprises a network of 6 square cupolae, 8 triangular cupolae, and 24 triangular prisms. It has 148 faces (8 triangles, 126 squares, 8 hexagons, and 6 octagons), 312 edges, and 144 vertices. With Euler characteristic χ = f + v - e = -20, its genus (g = (2-χ)/2) is 11.

Without the triangular prisms, the toroidal polyhedron becomes a truncated cuboctahedron.

Excavated
Truncated rhombicuboctahedron	Truncated cuboctahedron

== Related polyhedra ==
The truncated cuboctahedron is similar, with all regular faces, and 4.6.8 vertex figure.

The triangle and squares of the rhombicuboctahedron can be independently rectified or truncated, creating four permutations of polyhedra. The partially truncated forms can be seen as edge contractions of the truncated form.

The truncated rhombicuboctahedron can be seen in sequence of rectification and truncation operations from the cuboctahedron. A further alternation step leads to the snub rhombicuboctahedron.

related polyhedra
Name	r{4,3}	rr{4,3}	tr{4,3}	Rectified rrr{4,3}	Partially truncated		Truncated trr{4,3}	srCO
Conway	aC	aaC=eC	taC=bC	aaaC=eaC	dXC	dXdC	taaC=baC	saC
Image								
VertFigs	3.4.3.4	3.4.4.4	4.6.8	4.4.4.4_{d} and 3.4.4_{d}.4	4.4.4.6_{i} and 4.6.6_{i}	4.6_{i}.8 and 3.4.6_{i}.4	4.8.8_{p} and 4.6.8_{p}	3.3.3.3.4 and 3.3.4.3.4

== See also ==
- Expanded cuboctahedron
- Truncated rhombicosidodecahedron
