= Compound of twelve pentagrammic prisms =

Polyhedral compound

Compound of twelve pentagrammic prisms
Type	Uniform compound
Index	UC_{37}
Polyhedra	12 pentagrammic prisms
Faces	24 pentagrams, 60 squares
Edges	180
Vertices	60
Symmetry group	icosahedral (I_{h})
Subgroup restricting to one constituent	5-fold dihedral (D_{5})

This uniform polyhedron compound is a symmetric arrangement of 12 pentagrammic prisms, aligned in pairs with the axes of fivefold rotational symmetry of a dodecahedron.

It results from composing the two enantiomorphs of the compound of six pentagrammic prisms. In doing so, the vertices of the two enantiomorphs coincide, with the result that the full compound has two pentagrammic prisms incident on each of its vertices.

== Related polyhedra ==
This compound shares its vertex arrangement with four uniform polyhedra as follows:

Rhombicosidodecahedron	Small dodecicosidodecahedron	Small rhombidodecahedron
Small stellated truncated dodecahedron	Compound of six pentagrammic prisms	Compound of twelve pentagrammic prisms
