= Great rhombidodecahedron =

Polyhedron with 42 faces

Great rhombidodecahedron
Type	Uniform star polyhedron
Elements	F = 42, E = 120; V = 60 (χ = −18)
Faces by sides	30{4}+12{10/3}
Coxeter diagram	(with extra double-covered triangles) (with extra double-covered pentagrams)
Wythoff symbol	2 5/3 (3/2 5/4) |
Symmetry group	I_{h}, [5,3], *532
Index references	U_{73}, C_{89}, W_{109}
Dual polyhedron	Great rhombidodecacron
Vertex figure	4.10/3.4/3.10/7
Bowers acronym	Gird

3D model of a great rhombidodecahedron

In geometry, the great rhombidodecahedron is a nonconvex uniform polyhedron, indexed as U_{73}. It has 42 faces (30 squares, 12 decagrams), 120 edges and 60 vertices. Its vertex figure is a crossed quadrilateral.

== Related polyhedra ==
It shares its vertex arrangement with the truncated great dodecahedron and the uniform compounds of 6 or 12 pentagonal prisms. It additionally shares its edge arrangement with the nonconvex great rhombicosidodecahedron (having the square faces in common), and with the great dodecicosidodecahedron (having the decagrammic faces in common).

Nonconvex great rhombicosidodecahedron	Great dodecicosidodecahedron	Great rhombidodecahedron
Truncated great dodecahedron	Compound of six pentagonal prisms	Compound of twelve pentagonal prisms

== Gallery ==
Traditional filling	Modulo-2 filling

== See also ==
- List of uniform polyhedra
