= Great pentakis dodecahedron =

Polyhedron with 60 faces

Great pentakis dodecahedron
Type	Star polyhedron
Face	
Elements	F = 60, E = 90; V = 24 (χ = −6)
Symmetry group	I_{h}, [5,3], *532
Index references	DU_{58}
dual polyhedron	Small stellated truncated dodecahedron

3D model of a great pentakis dodecahedron

In geometry, the great pentakis dodecahedron is a nonconvex isohedral polyhedron.

It is the dual of the uniform small stellated truncated dodecahedron. The pentagonal faces pass close to the center in the uniform polyhedron, causing this dual to be very spikey. It has 60 intersecting isosceles triangle faces. Part of each triangle lies within the solid, hence is invisible in solid models.

== Proportions ==
The triangles have one very acute angle of $\arccos(\frac{1}{10}+\frac{2}{5}\sqrt{5})\approx 6.051\,689\,017\,91^{\circ}$ and two of $\arccos(\frac{1}{2}-\frac{1}{5}\sqrt{5})\approx 86.974\,155\,491\,04^{\circ}$. The dihedral angle equals $\arccos(\frac{-24+5\sqrt{5}}{41})\approx 108.220\,490\,680\,83^{\circ}$.
