= Great deltoidal hexecontahedron =

Catalan solid with sixty dart-shaped faces

Great deltoidal hexecontahedron
Type	Star polyhedron
Face	
Elements	F = 60, E = 120; V = 62 (χ = 2)
Symmetry group	I_{h}, [5,3], *532
Index references	DU_{67}
dual polyhedron	Nonconvex great rhombicosidodecahedron

3D model of a great deltoidal hexecontahedron

In geometry, the great deltoidal hexecontahedron (or great sagittal ditriacontahedron) is a nonconvex isohedral polyhedron. It is the dual of the nonconvex great rhombicosidodecahedron. It is visually identical to the great rhombidodecacron. It has 60 intersecting cross quadrilateral faces, 120 edges, and 62 vertices. Its faces are darts. Part of each dart lies inside the solid, hence is invisible in solid models.

It is also called a great strombic hexecontahedron.

== Proportions ==
The darts have two angles of $\arccos(\frac{1}{2}+\frac{1}{5}\sqrt{5})\approx 18.699\,407\,085\,15^{\circ}$, one of $\arccos(-\frac{1}{4}+\frac{1}{10}\sqrt{5})\approx 91.512\,394\,720\,74^{\circ}$ and one of $360^{\circ}-\arccos(-\frac{1}{8}-\frac{9}{40}\sqrt{5})\approx 231.088\,791\,108\,96^{\circ}$. The dihedral angle equals $\arccos(\frac{-19+8\sqrt{5}}{41})\approx 91.553\,403\,672\,16^{\circ}$. The ratio between the lengths of the long and short edges is $\frac{21+3\sqrt{5}}{22}\approx 1.259\,463\,815\,11$.
