= Small rhombidodecahedron =

Polyhedron with 42 faces

Small rhombidodecahedron
| Type | Uniform star polyhedron |
| Elements | F = 42, E = 120; V = 60 (χ = −18) |
| Faces by sides | 30{4}+12{10} |
| Coxeter diagram | (with extra double-covered triangles) (with extra double-covered pentagons) |
| Wythoff symbol | 2 5 (3/2 5/2) | |
| Symmetry group | I_{h}, [5,3], *532 |
| Index references | U_{39}, C_{46}, W_{74} |
| Dual polyhedron | Small rhombidodecacron |
| Vertex figure | 4.10.4/3.10/9 |
| Bowers acronym | Sird |

3D model of a small rhombidodecahedron

In geometry, the small rhombidodecahedron is a nonconvex uniform polyhedron, indexed as U_{39}. It has 42 faces (30 squares and 12 decagons), 120 edges, and 60 vertices. Its vertex figure is a crossed quadrilateral.

== Related polyhedra ==
It shares its vertex arrangement with the small stellated truncated dodecahedron and the uniform compounds of 6 or 12 pentagrammic prisms. It additionally shares its edge arrangement with the rhombicosidodecahedron (having the square faces in common), and with the small dodecicosidodecahedron (having the decagonal faces in common).

| Rhombicosidodecahedron | Small dodecicosidodecahedron | Small rhombidodecahedron |
| Small stellated truncated dodecahedron | Compound of six pentagrammic prisms | Compound of twelve pentagrammic prisms |

=== Small rhombidodecacron ===
Small rhombidodecacron
| Type | Star polyhedron |
| Face | |
| Elements | F = 60, E = 120; V = 42 (χ = −18) |
| Symmetry group | I_{h}, [5,3], *532 |
| Index references | DU_{39} |
| dual polyhedron | Small rhombidodecahedron |

3D model of a small rhombidodecacron

The small rhombidodecacron (or small dipteral ditriacontahedron) is a nonconvex isohedral polyhedron. It is the dual of the small rhombidodecahedron. It is visually identical to the Small dodecacronic hexecontahedron. It has 60 intersecting antiparallelogram faces.
