= Deltoidal hexecontahedron =

Catalan solid with 60 faces

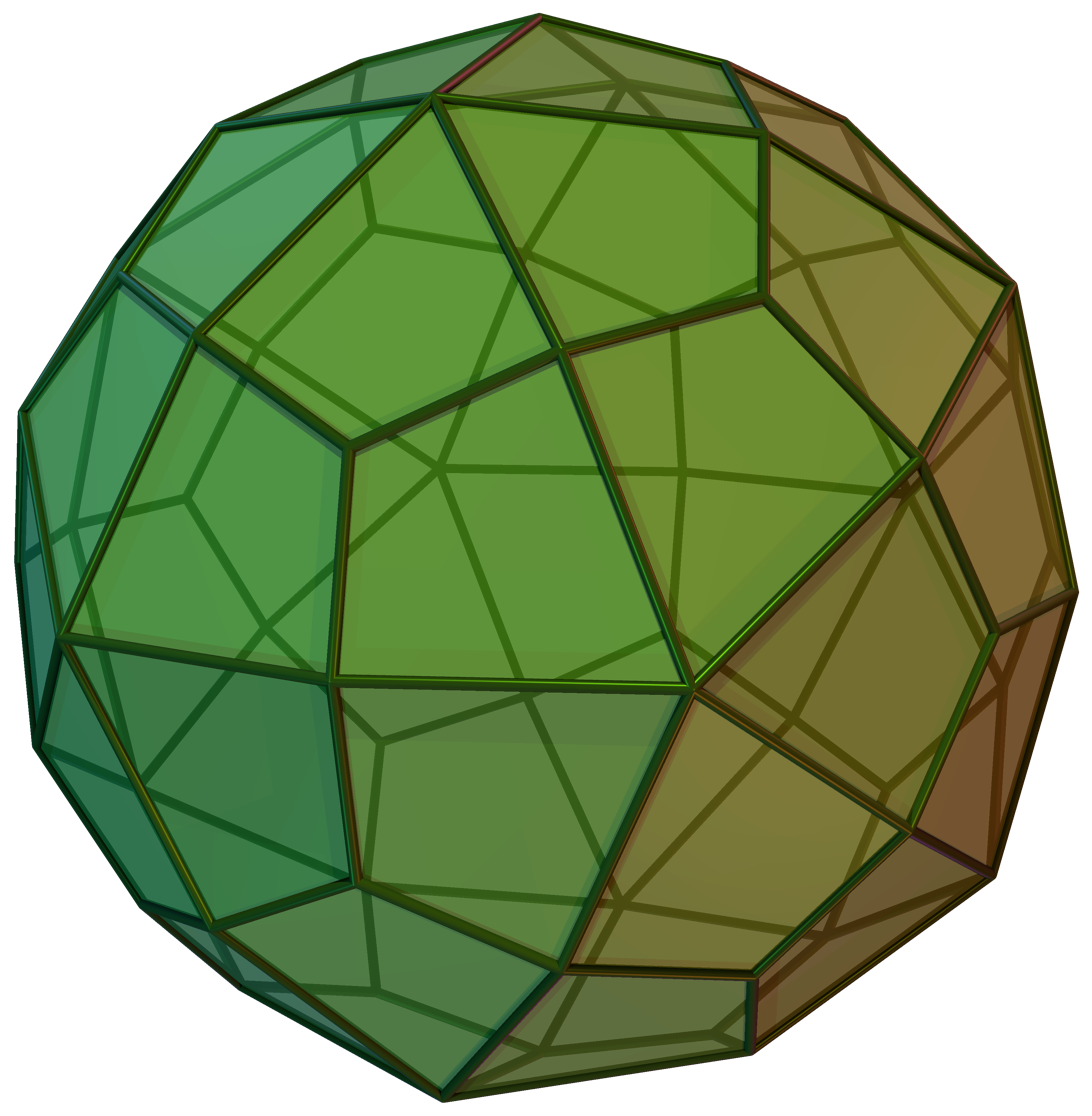
- Type: Catalan solid
- Faces: 60 kites
- Edges: 120
- Vertices: 62
- Symmetry group: icosahedral symmetry $\mathrm{I}_\mathrm{h}$
- Properties: convex, face-transitive

Net
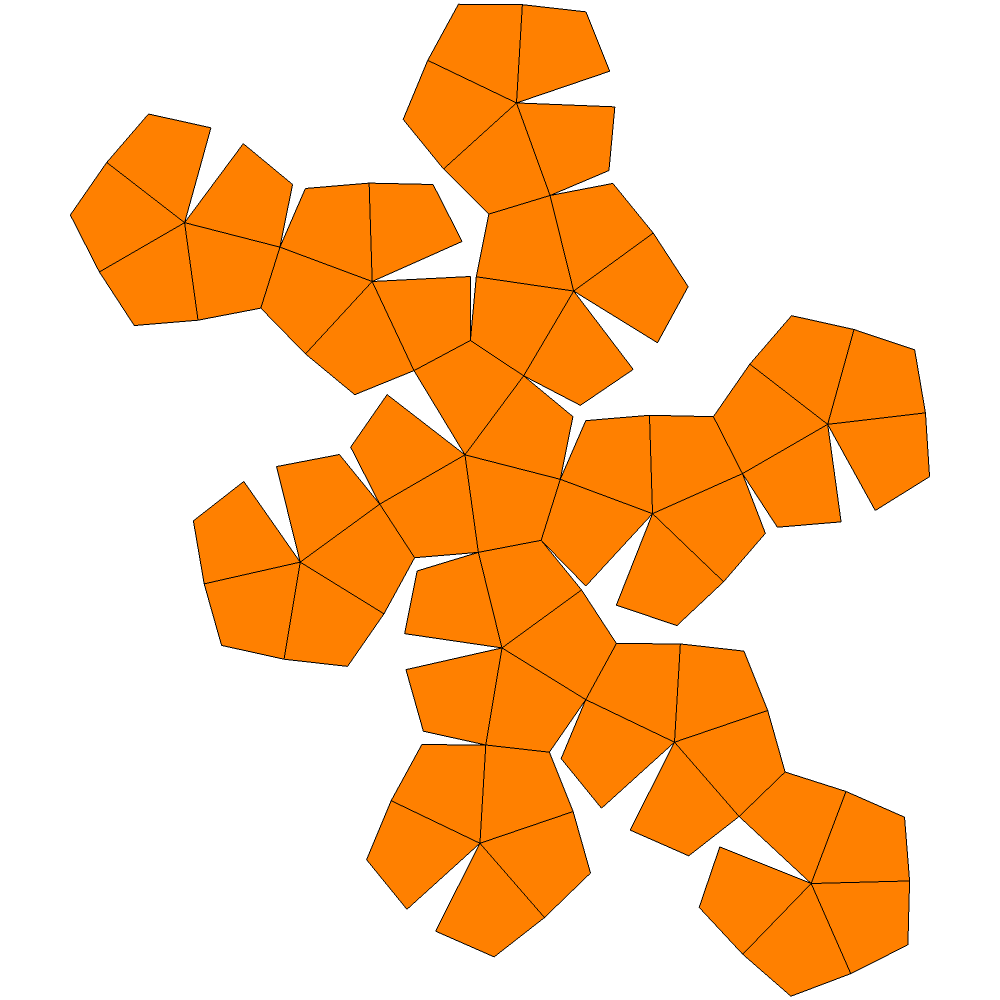

3D model of a deltoidal hexecontahedron

In geometry, a deltoidal hexecontahedron (also sometimes called a trapezoidal hexecontahedron, a strombic hexecontahedron, or a tetragonal hexacontahedron) is a Catalan solid which is the dual polyhedron of the rhombicosidodecahedron, an Archimedean solid. It is one of six Catalan solids to not have a Hamiltonian path among its vertices.

It is topologically identical to the nonconvex rhombic hexecontahedron.

== Lengths and angles ==
The 60 faces are deltoids or kites. The short and long edges of each kite are in the ratio $1:\frac{7+\sqrt{5}}{6}$ ≈ 1:1.539344663...

The angle between two short edges in a single face is $\arccos(\frac{-5-2\sqrt{5}}{20})$ ≈ 118.2686774705°. The opposite angle, between long edges, is $\arccos(\frac{-5+9\sqrt{5}}{40})$ ≈ 67.783011547435°. The other two angles of each face, between a short and a long edge each, are both equal to $\arccos(\frac{5-2\sqrt{5}}{10})$ ≈ 86.97415549104°.

The dihedral angle between any pair of adjacent faces is $\arccos(\frac{-19-8\sqrt{5}}{41})$ ≈ 154.12136312578°.

== Topology ==
Topologically, the deltoidal hexecontahedron is identical to the nonconvex rhombic hexecontahedron. The deltoidal hexecontahedron can be derived from a dodecahedron (or icosahedron) by pushing the face centers, edge centers and vertices out to different radii from the body center. The radii are chosen so that the resulting shape has planar kite faces each such that vertices go to degree-3 corners, faces to degree-five corners, and edge centers to degree-four points.

== Cartesian coordinates ==
The 62 vertices of the deltoidal hexecontahedron fall in three sets centered on the origin:

- Twelve vertices are of the form of a unit circumradius regular icosahedron.
- Twenty vertices are of the form of a $\frac{3}{11}\sqrt {15 - \frac{6}{\sqrt{5}}}\approx 0.9571$ scaled regular dodecahedron.
- Thirty vertices are of the form of a $3\sqrt {1-\frac{2}{\sqrt{5}}}\approx0.9748$ scaled Icosidodecahedron.

These hulls are visualized in the figure below:

== Orthogonal projections ==
The deltoidal hexecontahedron has 3 symmetry positions located on the 3 types of vertices:

Orthogonal projections
Projective symmetry	[2]	[2]	[2]	[2]	[6]	[10]
Image						
Dual image						

== Variations ==
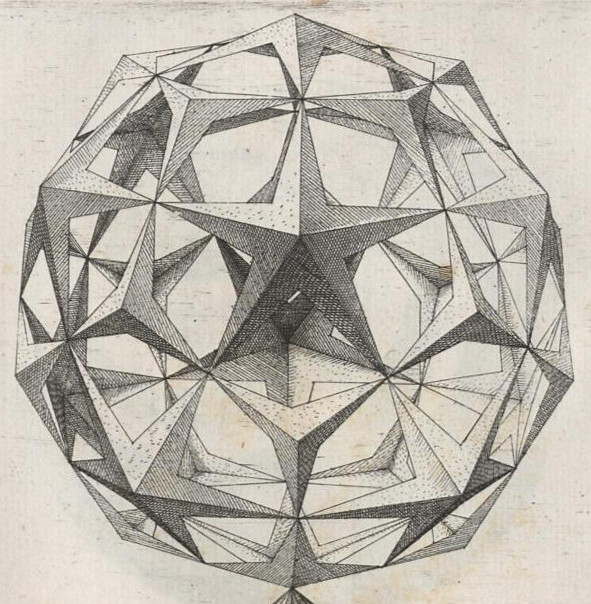
This figure from Perspectiva Corporum Regularium (1568) by Wenzel Jamnitzer can be seen as a deltoidal hexecontahedron.

The deltoidal hexecontahedron can be constructed from either the regular icosahedron or regular dodecahedron by adding vertices mid-edge, and mid-face, and creating new edges from each edge center to the face centers. Conway polyhedron notation would give these as oI, and oD, ortho-icosahedron, and ortho-dodecahedron. These geometric variations exist as a continuum along one degree of freedom.

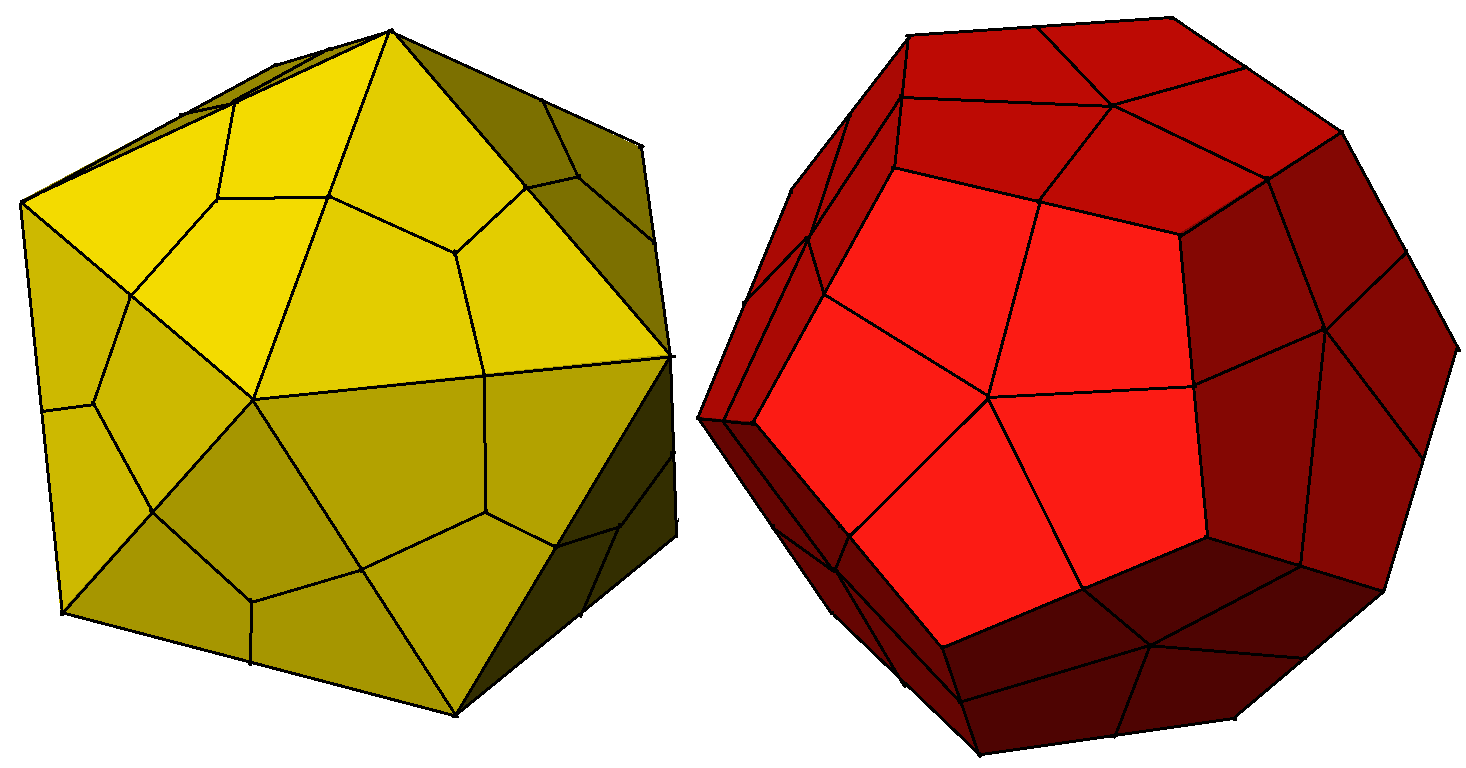

== Related polyhedra and tilings ==
Spherical deltoidal hexecontahedron

Family of uniform icosahedral polyhedra
Symmetry: [5,3], (*532)							[5,3]^{+}, (532)
{5,3}	t{5,3}	r{5,3}	t{3,5}	{3,5}	rr{5,3}	tr{5,3}	sr{5,3}
Duals to uniform polyhedra
V5.5.5	V3.10.10	V3.5.3.5	V5.6.6	V3.3.3.3.3	V3.4.5.4	V4.6.10	V3.3.3.3.5

When projected onto a sphere (see right), it can be seen that the edges make up the edges of an icosahedron and dodecahedron arranged in their dual positions.

This tiling is topologically related as a part of sequence of deltoidal polyhedra with face figure (V3.4.n.4), and continues as tilings of the hyperbolic plane. These face-transitive figures have (*n32) reflectional symmetry.

*n32 symmetry mutation of dual expanded tilings: V3.4.n.4
Symmetry *n32 [n,3]	Spherical				Euclid.	Compact hyperb.		Paraco.
Symmetry *n32 [n,3]	*232 [2,3]	*332 [3,3]	*432 [4,3]	*532 [5,3]	*632 [6,3]	*732 [7,3]	*832 [8,3]...	*∞32 [∞,3]
Figure Config.	V3.4.2.4	V3.4.3.4	V3.4.4.4	V3.4.5.4	V3.4.6.4	V3.4.7.4	V3.4.8.4	V3.4.∞.4

== See also ==
- Deltoidal icositetrahedron
