= Rhombicosidodecahedron =

Archimedean solid with 62 faces

Rhombicosidodecahedron
(Click here for rotating model)
Type	Archimedean solid Uniform polyhedron
Elements	F = 62, E = 120, V = 60 (χ = 2)
Faces by sides	20{3}+30{4}+12{5}
Conway notation	eD or aaD
Schläfli symbols	rr{5,3} or $r\begin{Bmatrix} 5 \\ 3 \end{Bmatrix}$
Schläfli symbols	t_{0,2}{5,3}
Wythoff symbol	3 5 | 2
Coxeter diagram	
Symmetry group	I_{h}, H_{3}, [5,3], (*532), order 120
Rotation group	I, [5,3]^{+}, (532), order 60
Dihedral angle	3-4: 159°05′41″ (159.09°); 4-5: 148°16′57″ (148.28°)
References	U_{27}, C_{30}, W_{14}
Properties	Semiregular convex
Colored faces	3.4.5.4 (Vertex figure)
Deltoidal hexecontahedron (dual polyhedron)	Net

In geometry, the rhombicosidodecahedron is an Archimedean solid, one of thirteen convex isogonal nonprismatic solids constructed of two or more types of regular polygon faces.

It has a total of 62 faces: 20 regular triangular faces, 30 square faces, 12 regular pentagonal faces, with 60 vertices, and 120 edges.

3D model of a rhombicosidodecahedron

== Names ==
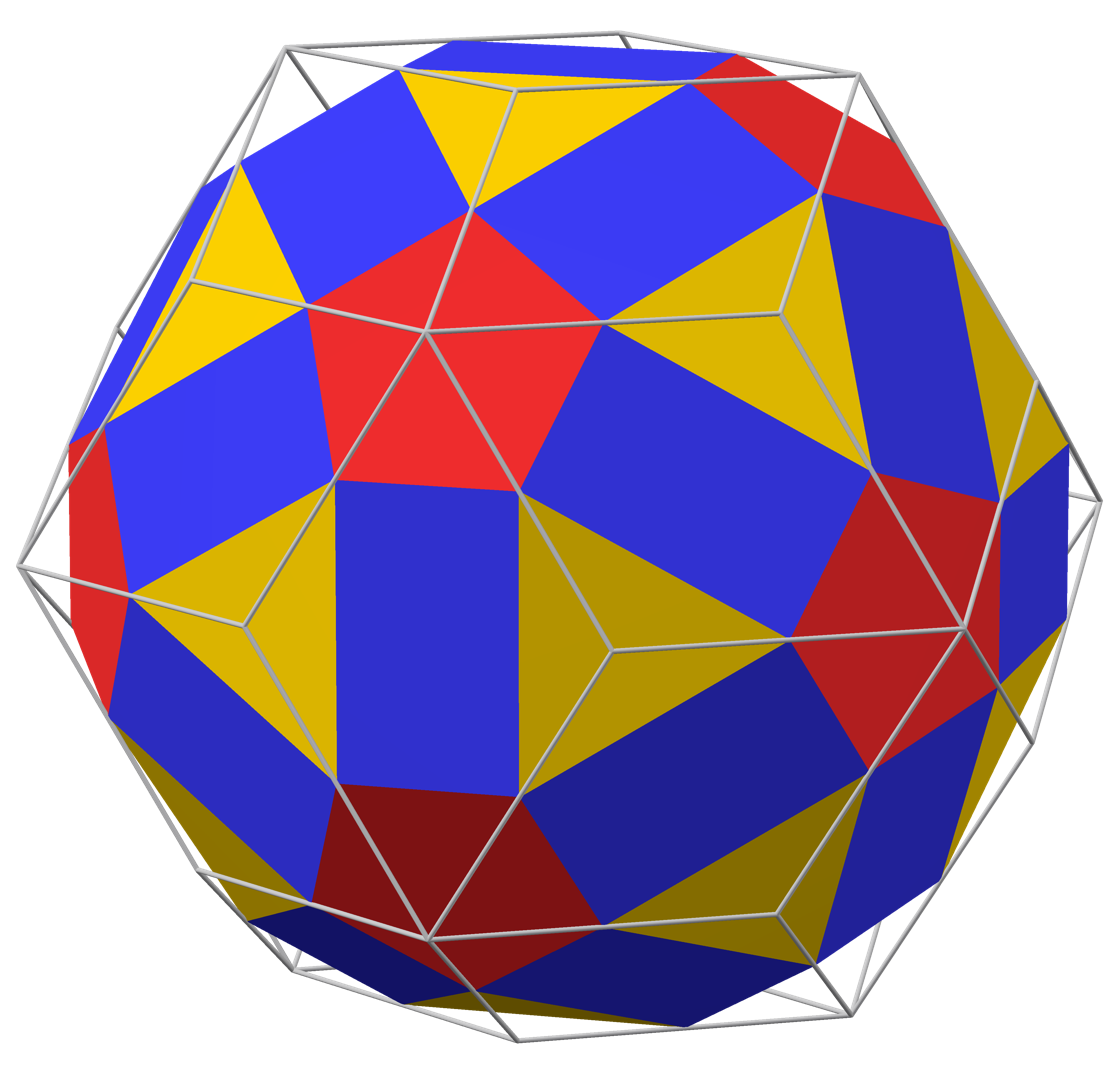
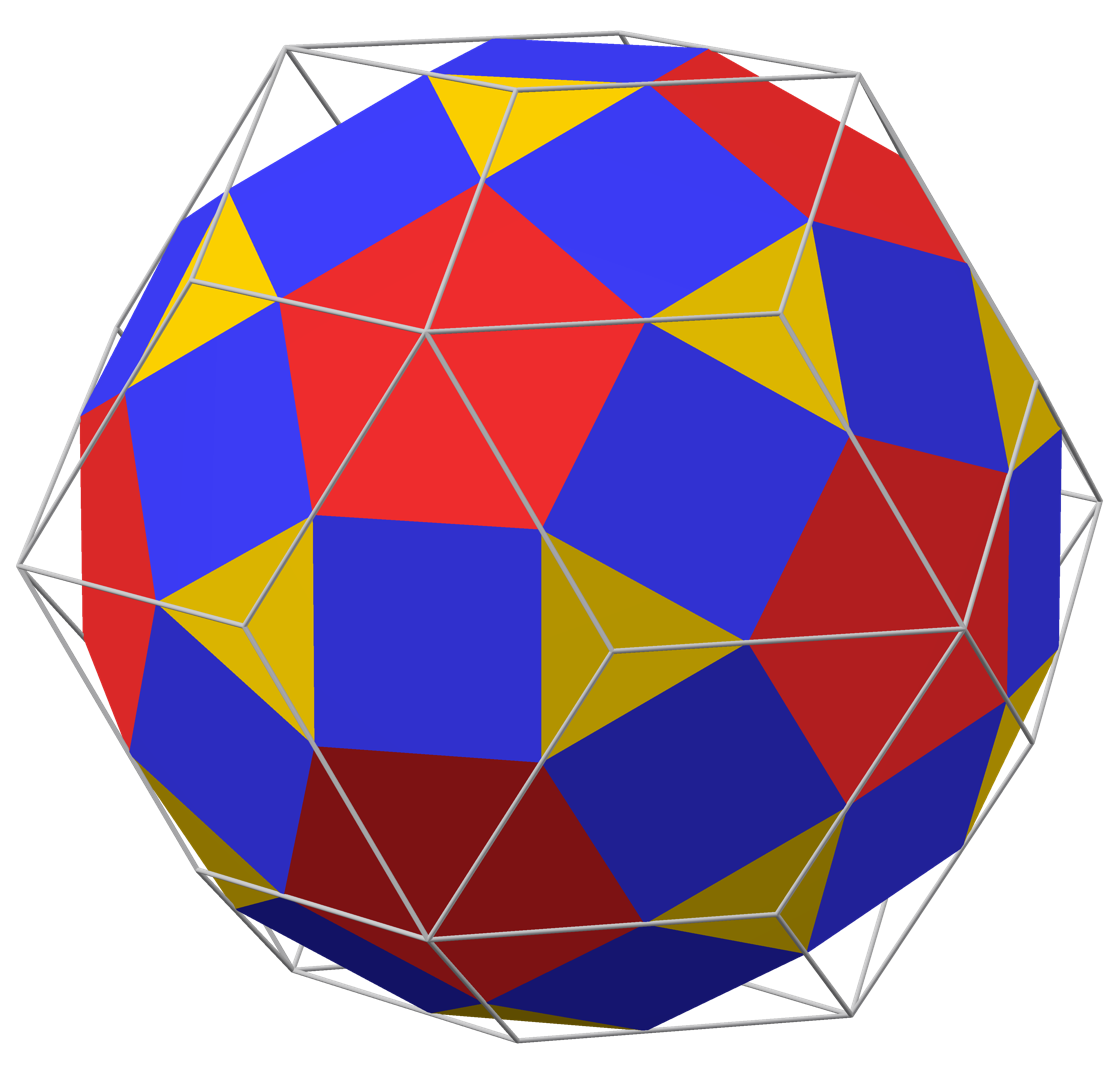
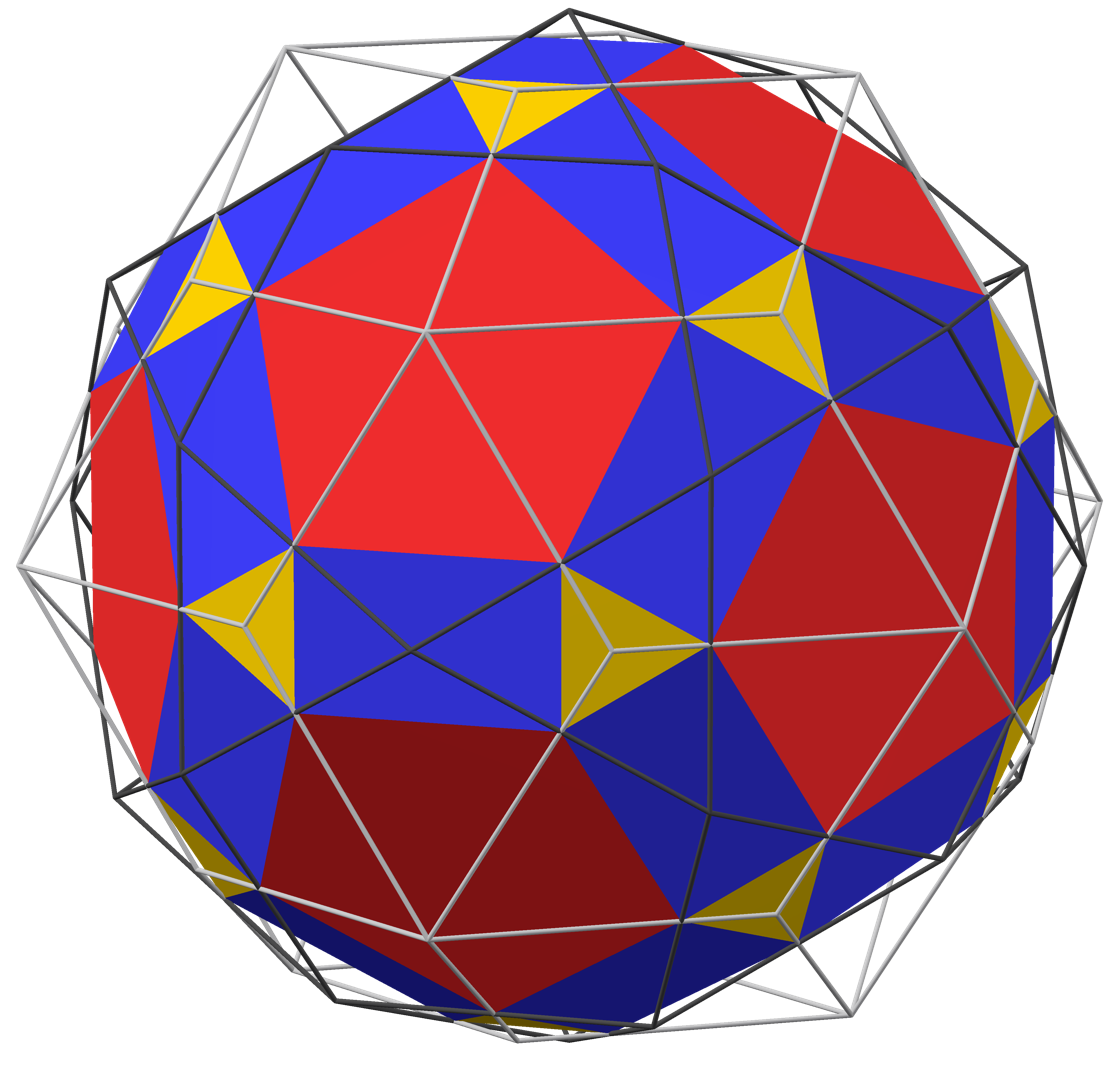

Johannes Kepler in Harmonices Mundi (1618) named this polyhedron a rhombicosidodecahedron, being short for truncated icosidodecahedral rhombus, with icosidodecahedral rhombus being his name for a rhombic triacontahedron. There are different truncations of a rhombic triacontahedron into a topological rhombicosidodecahedron: Prominently its rectification (left), the one that creates the uniform solid (center), and the rectification of the dual icosidodecahedron (right), which is the core of the dual compound.

== Dimensions ==
For a rhombicosidodecahedron with edge length a, its surface area and volume are:

$$\begin{align} A &= \left(30+5\sqrt{3}+3\sqrt{25+10\sqrt{5}}\right)a^2 &&\approx 59.305\,982\,844\,9 a^2 \\ V &=\frac{60+29\sqrt{5}}{3}a^3 &&\approx 41.615\,323\,782\,5 a^3 \end{align}$$

== Geometric relations ==
Cantellating either a regular dodecahedron or regular icosahedron produces a rhombicosidodecahedron.

Cantellation of either a regular dodecahedron or a regular icosahedron creates a rhombicosidodecahedron.

Expanding an icosidodecahedron by moving the faces away from the origin the right amount, rotating each face so that each triangle vertex continues to touch a pentagon vertex, without changing the size of the faces, and patching the square holes in the result, yields a rhombicosidodecahedron. Therefore, it has the same number of triangles as an icosahedron and the same number of pentagons as a dodecahedron, with a square for each edge of either.

Alternatively, expanding each of five cubes by moving the faces away from the origin the right amount and rotating each of the five 72° around so they are equidistant from each other, without changing the orientation or size of the faces, and patching the pentagonal and triangular holes in the result, yields a rhombicosidodecahedron. Therefore, it has the same number of squares as five cubes.

Two clusters of faces of the bilunabirotunda, the lunes (each lune featuring two triangles adjacent to opposite sides of one square), can be aligned with a congruent patch of faces on the rhombicosidodecahedron. If two bilunabirotundae are aligned this way on opposite sides of the rhombicosidodecahedron, then a cube can be put between the bilunabirotundae at the very center of the rhombicosidodecahedron.

The rhombicosidodecahedron shares the vertex arrangement with the small stellated truncated dodecahedron, and with the uniform compounds of six or twelve pentagrammic prisms.

The Zometool kits for making geodesic domes and other polyhedra use slotted balls as connectors. The balls are "expanded" rhombicosidodecahedra, with the squares replaced by rectangles. The expansion is chosen so that the resulting rectangles are golden rectangles.

Twelve of the 92 Johnson solids are derived from the rhombicosidodecahedron, four of them by rotation of one or more pentagonal cupolae: the gyrate, parabigyrate, metabigyrate, and trigyrate rhombicosidodecahedron. Eight more can be constructed by removing up to three cupolae, sometimes also rotating one or more of the other cupolae.

== Cartesian coordinates ==
Cartesian coordinates for the vertices of a rhombicosidodecahedron with an edge length of 2 centered at the origin are all even permutations of:

(±1, ±1, ±φ^{3}),
(±φ^{2}, ±φ, ±2φ),
(±(2+φ), 0, ±φ^{2}),

where φ = (1 + √5)/2 is the golden ratio. Therefore, the circumradius of this rhombicosidodecahedron is the common distance of these points from the origin, namely √φ^{6}+2 = √8φ+7 for edge length 2. For unit edge length, R must be halved, giving

R = (√8φ+7)/2 = (√11+4√5)/2 ≈ 2.233.

== Orthogonal projections ==
The rhombicosidodecahedron has six special orthogonal projections, centered, on a vertex, on two types of edges, and three types of faces: triangles, squares, and pentagons. The last two correspond to the A_{2} and H_{2} Coxeter planes.

Orthogonal projections
Centered by	Vertex	Edge 3-4	Edge 5-4	Face Square	Face Triangle	Face Pentagon
Solid						
Wireframe						
Projective symmetry	[2]	[2]	[2]	[2]	[6]	[10]
Dual image						

== Spherical tiling ==
The rhombicosidodecahedron can also be represented as a spherical tiling, and projected onto the plane via a stereographic projection. This projection is conformal, preserving angles but not areas or lengths. Straight lines on the sphere are projected as circular arcs on the plane.

	Pentagon-centered	Triangle-centered	Square-centered
Orthographic projection	Stereographic projections		

== Related polyhedra ==
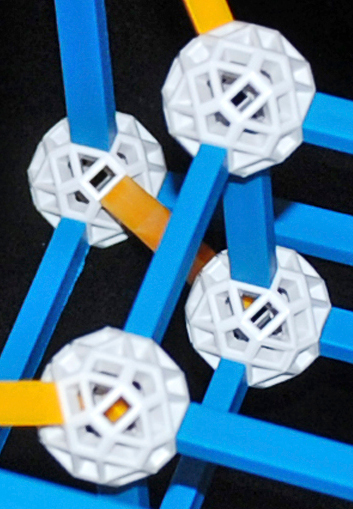
A version with golden rectangles is used as vertex element of the construction set Zometool.

Family of uniform icosahedral polyhedra
Symmetry: [5,3], (*532)							[5,3]^{+}, (532)
{5,3}	t{5,3}	r{5,3}	t{3,5}	{3,5}	rr{5,3}	tr{5,3}	sr{5,3}
Duals to uniform polyhedra
V5.5.5	V3.10.10	V3.5.3.5	V5.6.6	V3.3.3.3.3	V3.4.5.4	V4.6.10	V3.3.3.3.5

=== Symmetry mutations ===
This polyhedron is topologically related as a part of a sequence of cantellated polyhedra with vertex figure (3.4.n.4), which continues as tilings of the hyperbolic plane. These vertex-transitive figures have (*n32) reflectional symmetry.

*n32 symmetry mutation of expanded tilings: 3.4.n.4
Symmetry *n32 [n,3]	Spherical				Euclid.	Compact hyperb.		Paracomp.
Symmetry *n32 [n,3]	*232 [2,3]	*332 [3,3]	*432 [4,3]	*532 [5,3]	*632 [6,3]	*732 [7,3]	*832 [8,3]...	*∞32 [∞,3]
Figure								
Config.	3.4.2.4	3.4.3.4	3.4.4.4	3.4.5.4	3.4.6.4	3.4.7.4	3.4.8.4	3.4.∞.4

=== Johnson solids ===
There are 12 related Johnson solids, 5 by diminishment, and 8 including gyrations:

Diminished
J5	76	80	81	83

Gyrated and/or diminished
72	73	74	75
77	78	79	82

=== Vertex arrangement ===
The rhombicosidodecahedron shares its vertex arrangement with three nonconvex uniform polyhedra: the small stellated truncated dodecahedron, the small dodecicosidodecahedron (having the triangular and pentagonal faces in common), and the small rhombidodecahedron (having the square faces in common).

It also shares its vertex arrangement with the uniform compounds of six or twelve pentagrammic prisms.

Rhombicosidodecahedron	Small dodecicosidodecahedron	Small rhombidodecahedron
Small stellated truncated dodecahedron	Compound of six pentagrammic prisms	Compound of twelve pentagrammic prisms

== Rhombicosidodecahedral graph ==
Rhombicosidodecahedral graph
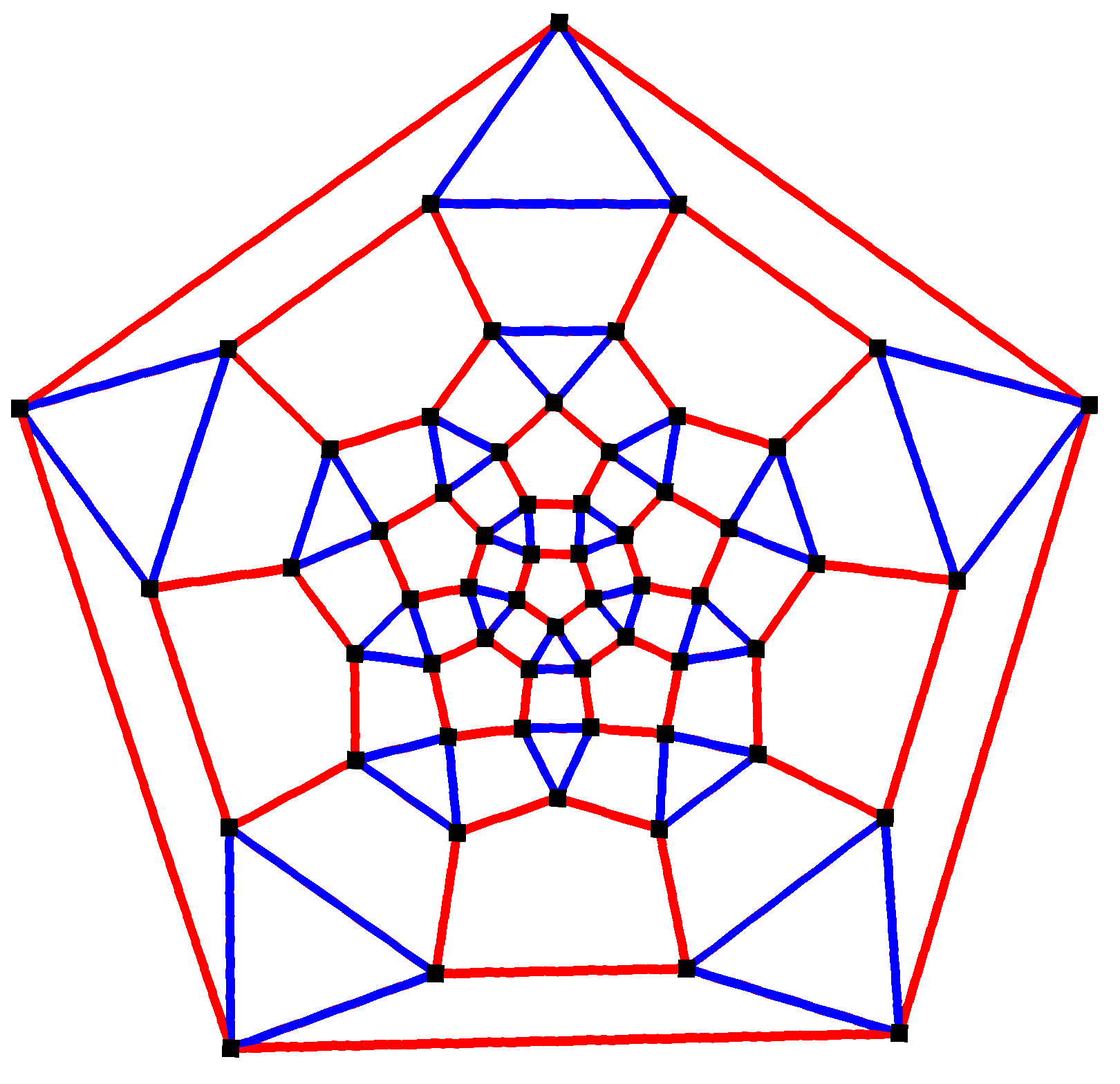
- Pentagon centered Schlegel diagram
- Vertices: 60
- Edges: 120
- Automorphisms: 120
- Properties: Quartic graph, Hamiltonian, regular

In the mathematical field of graph theory, a rhombicosidodecahedral graph is the graph of vertices and edges of the rhombicosidodecahedron, one of the Archimedean solids. It has 60 vertices and 120 edges, and is a quartic graph Archimedean graph.

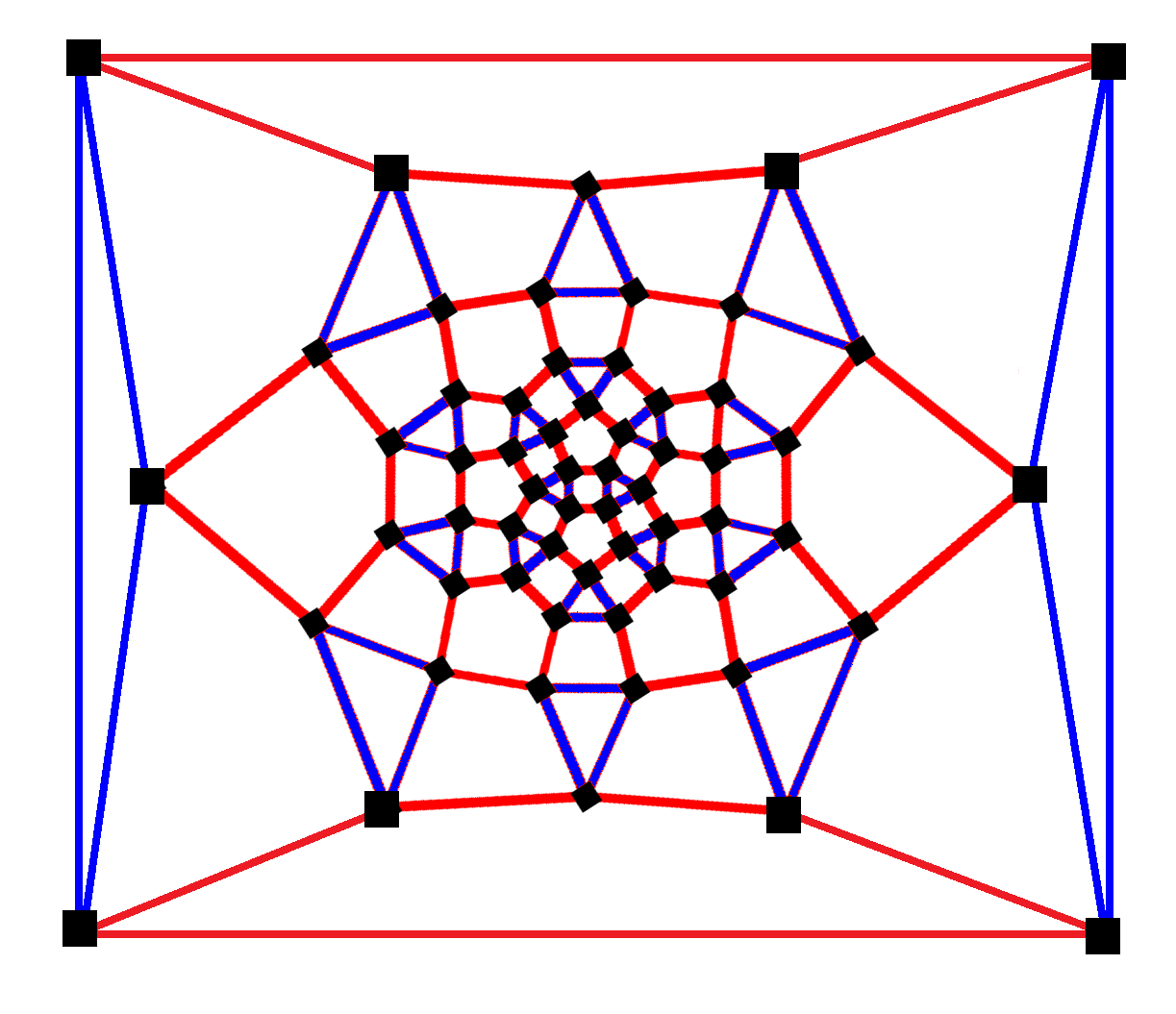
Square centered Schlegel diagram

== See also ==
- Truncated rhombicosidodecahedron
