= Small stellapentakis dodecahedron =

Polyhedron with 60 faces

Small stellapentakis dodecahedron
Type	Star polyhedron
Face	
Elements	F = 60, E = 90; V = 24 (χ = −6)
Symmetry group	I_{h}, [5,3], *532
Index references	DU_{37}
dual polyhedron	Truncated great dodecahedron

In geometry, the small stellapentakis dodecahedron is a nonconvex isohedral polyhedron. It is the dual of the truncated great dodecahedron. It has 60 intersecting triangular faces.

3D model of a small stellapentakis dodecahedron

== Proportions ==
The triangles have two acute angles of $\arccos(\frac{1}{2}+\frac{1}{5}\sqrt{5})\approx 18.699\,407\,085\,149^{\circ}$ and one obtuse angle of $\arccos(\frac{1}{10}-\frac{2}{5}\sqrt{5})\approx 142.601\,185\,829\,70^{\circ}$. The dihedral angle equals $\arccos(\frac{-24-5\sqrt{5}}{41})\approx 149.099\,125\,827\,35^{\circ}$. Part of each triangle lies within the solid, hence is invisible in solid models.
