= Small nucleolar RNA SNORD37 =

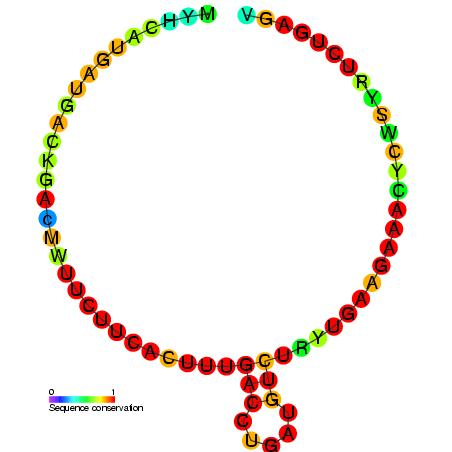
- Predicted secondary structure and sequence conservation of SNORD37

Identifiers
- Symbol: SNORD37
- Alt. Symbols: U37
- Rfam: RF00440

Other data
- RNA type: Gene; snRNA; snoRNA; C/D-box
- Domain: Eukaryota
- GO: GO:0006396 GO:0005730
- SO: SO:0000593
- PDB structures: PDBe

In molecular biology, SNORD37 (also known as U37) is a non-coding RNA (ncRNA) molecule which functions in the modification of other small nuclear RNAs (snRNAs). This type of modifying RNA is usually located in the nucleolus of the eukaryotic cell which is a major site of snRNA biogenesis. It is known as a small nucleolar RNA (snoRNA) and also often referred to as a guide RNA.

snoRNA U37 belongs to the C/D box class of snoRNAs which contain the conserved sequence motifs known as the C box (UGAUGA) and the D box (CUGA). Most of the members of the C/D box family function in directing site-specific 2'-O-methylation of substrate RNAs.

This snoRNA was originally identified by computational screening of vertebrate genomes for conserved C/D box motifs within intronic regions and expression experimentally verified by northern blotting. The mouse orthologue was identified.

SNORD37 is predicted to guide the 2'O-ribose methylation of the 28S ribosomal RNA (rRNA) at residue A3697.
