= Great dodecacronic hexecontahedron =

Polyhedron with 60 faces

Great dodecacronic hexecontahedron
Type	Star polyhedron
Face	
Elements	F = 60, E = 120; V = 44 (χ = −16)
Symmetry group	I_{h}, [5,3], *532
Index references	DU_{61}
dual polyhedron	Great dodecicosidodecahedron

3D model of a great dodecacronic hexecontahedron

In geometry, the great dodecacronic hexecontahedron (or great lanceal ditriacontahedron) is a nonconvex isohedral polyhedron. It is the dual of the uniform great dodecicosidodecahedron. Its 60 intersecting quadrilateral faces are kites. Part of each kite lies inside the solid, hence is invisible in solid models.

== Proportions ==
Each kite has two angles of $\arccos(\frac{5}{8}-\frac{1}{8}\sqrt{5})\approx 69.788\,198\,194\,11^{\circ}$, one of $\arccos(-\frac{1}{4}+\frac{1}{10}\sqrt{5})\approx 91.512\,394\,720\,74^{\circ}$ and one of $\arccos(-\frac{1}{8}-\frac{9}{40}\sqrt{5})\approx 128.911\,208\,891\,04^{\circ}$. The dihedral angle equals $\arccos(\frac{-19+8\sqrt{5}}{41})\approx 91.553\,403\,672\,16^{\circ}$. The ratio between the lengths of the long and short edges is $\frac{21+3\sqrt{5}}{22}\approx 1.259\,463\,815\,11$.
