= Small rhombidodecacron =

60-sided polyhedron

Small rhombidodecacron
Type	Star polyhedron
Face	
Elements	F = 60, E = 120; V = 42 (χ = −18)
Symmetry group	I_{h}, [5,3], *532
Index references	DU_{39}
dual polyhedron	Small rhombidodecahedron

3D model of a small rhombidodecacron

In geometry, the small rhombidodecacron is a nonconvex isohedral polyhedron. It is the dual of the small rhombidodecahedron. It is visually identical to the Small dodecacronic hexecontahedron. It has 60 intersecting antiparallelogram faces.

== Proportions ==
Each face has two angles of $\arccos(\frac{5}{8}+\frac{1}{8}\sqrt{5})\approx 25.242\,832\,961\,52^{\circ}$ and two angles of $\arccos(-\frac{1}{2}+\frac{1}{5}\sqrt{5})\approx 93.025\,844\,508\,96^{\circ}$. The diagonals of each antiparallelogram intersect at an angle of $\arccos(\frac{1}{4}+\frac{1}{10}\sqrt{5})\approx 61.731\,322\,529\,52^{\circ}$. The ratio between the lengths of the long edges and the short ones equals $\frac{1}{2}+\frac{1}{2}\sqrt{5}$, which is the golden ratio. The dihedral angle equals $\arccos(\frac{-19-8\sqrt{5}}{41})\approx 154.121\,363\,125\,78^{\circ}$.
