= Truncated rhombicosidodecahedron =

Type of polyhedron

Truncated rhombicosidodecahedron
| Schläfli symbol | trr{5,3} = $tr\begin{Bmatrix} 5 \\ 3 \end{Bmatrix}$ |
| Conway notation | taD = baD |
| Faces | 122: 60 {4} 20 {6} 30 {8} 12 {10} |
| Edges | 360 |
| Vertices | 240 |
| Symmetry group | I_{h}, [5,3], (*532) order 120 |
| Rotation group | I, [5,3]^{+}, (532), order 60 |
| Dual polyhedron | Disdyakis hexecontahedron |
| Properties | convex |

In geometry, the truncated rhombicosidodecahedron is a polyhedron, constructed as a truncated rhombicosidodecahedron. It has 122 faces: 12 decagons, 30 octagons, 20 hexagons, and 60 squares.

== Other names ==
- Truncated small rhombicosidodecahedron
- Beveled icosidodecahedron

== Zonohedron ==
As a zonohedron, it can be constructed with all but 30 octagons as regular polygons. It is 2-uniform, with 2 sets of 120 vertices existing on two distances from its center.

This polyhedron represents the Minkowski sum of a truncated icosidodecahedron, and a rhombic triacontahedron.

== Related polyhedra ==
The truncated icosidodecahedron is similar, with all regular faces, and 4.6.10 vertex figure. Also see the truncated rhombirhombicosidodecahedron.

| truncated icosidodecahedron | Truncated rhombicosidodecahedron |
|---|---|
| 4.6.10 | 4.8.10 and 4.6.8 |

The truncated rhombicosidodecahedron can be seen in sequence of rectification and truncation operations from the icosidodecahedron. A further alternation step leads to the snub rhombicosidodecahedron.

| Name | Icosidodeca- hedron | Rhomb- icosidodeca- hedron | Truncated rhomb- icosidodeca- hedron | Snub rhomb- icosidodeca- hedron |
| Coxeter | ID (rD) | rID (rrD) | trID (trrD) | srID (htrrD) |
| Conway | aD | aaD = eD | taaD = baD | saD |
|---|---|---|---|---|
| Image | | | | |
| Conway | jD | oD | maD | gaD |
| Dual | | | | |

== See also ==
- Expanded icosidodecahedron
- Truncated rhombicuboctahedron
