= Great rhombidodecacron =

Polyhedron with 60 faces

Great rhombidodecacron
Type	Star polyhedron
Face	
Elements	F = 60, E = 120; V = 42 (χ = −18)
Symmetry group	I_{h}, [5,3], *532
Index references	DU_{73}
dual polyhedron	Great rhombidodecahedron

3D model of a great rhombidodecacron

In geometry, the great rhombidodecacron (or Great dipteral ditriacontahedron) is a nonconvex isohedral polyhedron. It is the dual of the great rhombidodecahedron. It is visually identical to the great deltoidal hexecontahedron. Its faces are antiparallelograms.

== Proportions ==
Each antiparallelogram has two angles of $\arccos(\frac{1}{2}+\frac{1}{5}\sqrt{5})\approx 18.699\,407\,085\,15^{\circ}$ and two angles of $\arccos(-\frac{5}{8}+\frac{1}{8}\sqrt{5})\approx 110.211\,801\,805\,89^{\circ}$. The diagonals of each antiparallelogram intersect at an angle of $\arccos(\frac{1}{8}+\frac{9\sqrt{5}}{40})\approx 51.088\,791\,108\,96^{\circ}$. The dihedral angle equals $\arccos(\frac{-19+8\sqrt{5}}{41})\approx 91.553\,403\,672\,16^{\circ}$. The ratio between the lengths of the long edges and the short ones equals $\frac{1}{2}+\frac{1}{2}\sqrt{5}$, which is the golden ratio. Part of each face lies inside the solid, hence is invisible in solid models.
