= Small dodecicosidodecahedron =

Polyhedron with 44 faces

Small dodecicosidodecahedron
| Type | Uniform star polyhedron |
| Elements | F = 44, E = 120; V = 60 (χ = −16) |
| Faces by sides | 20{3}+12{5}+12{10} |
| Coxeter diagram | |
| Wythoff symbol | 3/2 5 | 5; 3 5/4 | 5 |
| Symmetry group | I_{h}, [5,3], *532 |
| Index references | U_{33}, C_{42}, W_{72} |
| Dual polyhedron | Small dodecacronic hexecontahedron |
| Vertex figure | 5.10.3/2.10 |
| Bowers acronym | Saddid |

3D model of a small dodecicosidodecahedron

In geometry, the small dodecicosidodecahedron (or small dodekicosidodecahedron) is a nonconvex uniform polyhedron, indexed as U_{33}. It has 44 faces (20 triangles, 12 pentagons, and 12 decagons), 120 edges, and 60 vertices. Its vertex figure is a crossed quadrilateral.

== Related polyhedra ==
It shares its vertex arrangement with the small stellated truncated dodecahedron and the uniform compounds of 6 or 12 pentagrammic prisms. It additionally shares its edge arrangement with the rhombicosidodecahedron (having the triangular and pentagonal faces in common), and with the small rhombidodecahedron (having the decagonal faces in common).

| Rhombicosidodecahedron | Small dodecicosidodecahedron | Small rhombidodecahedron |
| Small stellated truncated dodecahedron | Compound of six pentagrammic prisms | Compound of twelve pentagrammic prisms |

=== Dual ===
Small dodecacronic hexecontahedron
| Type | Star polyhedron |
| Face | |
| Elements | F = 60, E = 120; V = 44 (χ = −16) |
| Symmetry group | I_{h}, [5,3], *532 |
| Index references | DU_{33} |
| dual polyhedron | Small dodecicosidodecahedron |

3D model of a small dodecacronic hexecontahedron

The dual polyhedron to the small dodecicosidodecahedron is the small dodecacronic hexecontahedron (or small sagittal ditriacontahedron). It is visually identical to the small rhombidodecacron. Its faces are darts. A part of each dart lies inside the solid, hence is invisible in solid models.

==== Proportions ====
Faces have two angles of $\arccos(\frac{5}{8}+\frac{1}{8}\sqrt{5})\approx 25.242\,832\,961\,52^{\circ}$, one of $\arccos(-\frac{1}{8}+\frac{9}{40}\sqrt{5})\approx 67.783\,011\,547\,44^{\circ}$ and one of $360^{\circ}-\arccos(-\frac{1}{4}-\frac{1}{10}\sqrt{5})\approx 241.731\,322\,529\,52^{\circ}$. Its dihedral angles equal $\arccos({\frac{-19-8\sqrt{5}}{41}})\approx 154.121\,363\,125\,78^{\circ}$. The ratio between the lengths of the long and short edges is $\frac{7+\sqrt{5}}{6}\approx 1.539\,344\,662\,92$.
