= Truncated pentakis dodecahedron =

Truncated pentakis dodecahedron
Conway notation	tkD
Goldberg polyhedron	GP_{V}(3,0) or {5+,3}_{3,0}
Fullerene	C_{180}
Faces	92: 12 pentagons 20+60 hexagons
Edges	270 (2 types)
Vertices	180 (2 types)
Vertex configuration	(60) 5.6.6 (120) 6.6.6
Symmetry group	Icosahedral (I_{h})
Dual polyhedron	Hexapentakis truncated icosahedron
Properties	convex

The truncated pentakis dodecahedron is a convex polyhedron constructed as a truncation of the pentakis dodecahedron. It is Goldberg polyhedron G_{V}(3,0), with pentagonal faces separated by an edge-direct distance of 3 steps.

== Related polyhedra ==
It is in an infinite sequence of Goldberg polyhedra:

Index	GP(1,0)	GP(2,0)	GP(3,0)	GP(4,0)	GP(5,0)	GP(6,0)	GP(7,0)	GP(8,0)...
Image	D	kD	tkD					
Duals	I	cD	ktI					

== See also ==
- Near-miss Johnson solid
- Truncated tetrakis cube
