= Capsid =

Protein shell of a virus

Schematic of a cytomegalovirus

Illustration of geometric model changing between two possible capsids. A similar change of size has been observed as the result of a single amino-acid mutation

A capsid is the protein shell of a virus, enclosing its genetic material. It consists of several oligomeric (repeating) structural subunits made of protein called protomers. The observable 3-dimensional morphological subunits, which may or may not correspond to individual proteins, are called capsomeres. The proteins making up the capsid are called capsid proteins or viral coat proteins (VCP). The virus genomic component inside the capsid, along with occasionally present virus core protein, is called the virus core. The capsid and core together are referred to as a nucleocapsid (cf. also virion).

Capsids are broadly classified according to their structure. The majority of the viruses have capsids with either helical or icosahedral structure. Some viruses, such as bacteriophages, have developed more complicated structures due to constraints of elasticity and electrostatics. The icosahedral shape, which has 20 equilateral triangular faces, approximates a sphere, while the helical shape resembles the shape of a spring, taking the space of a cylinder but not being a cylinder itself. The capsid faces may consist of one or more proteins. For example, the foot-and-mouth disease virus capsid has faces consisting of three proteins named VP1–3.

Some viruses are enveloped, meaning that the capsid is coated with a lipid membrane known as the viral envelope. The envelope is acquired by the capsid from a cellular membrane in the virus' host; examples include the inner nuclear membrane, the Golgi membrane, and the cell's outer membrane.

Once the virus has infected a cell and begins replicating itself, new capsid subunits are synthesized using the protein biosynthesis mechanism of the cell. In some viruses, including those with helical capsids and especially those with RNA genomes, the capsid proteins co-assemble with their genomes. In other viruses, especially more complex viruses with double-stranded DNA genomes, the capsid proteins assemble into empty precursor procapsids that include a specialized portal structure at one vertex. Through this portal, viral DNA is translocated into the capsid.

Structural analyses of major capsid protein (MCP) architectures have been used to categorise viruses into lineages. For example, the bacteriophage PRD1, the algal virus Paramecium bursaria Chlorella virus-1 (PBCV-1), mimivirus and the mammalian adenovirus have been placed in the same lineage, whereas tailed, double-stranded DNA bacteriophages (Caudovirales) and herpesvirus belong to a second lineage.

== Specific shapes ==
=== Icosahedral ===
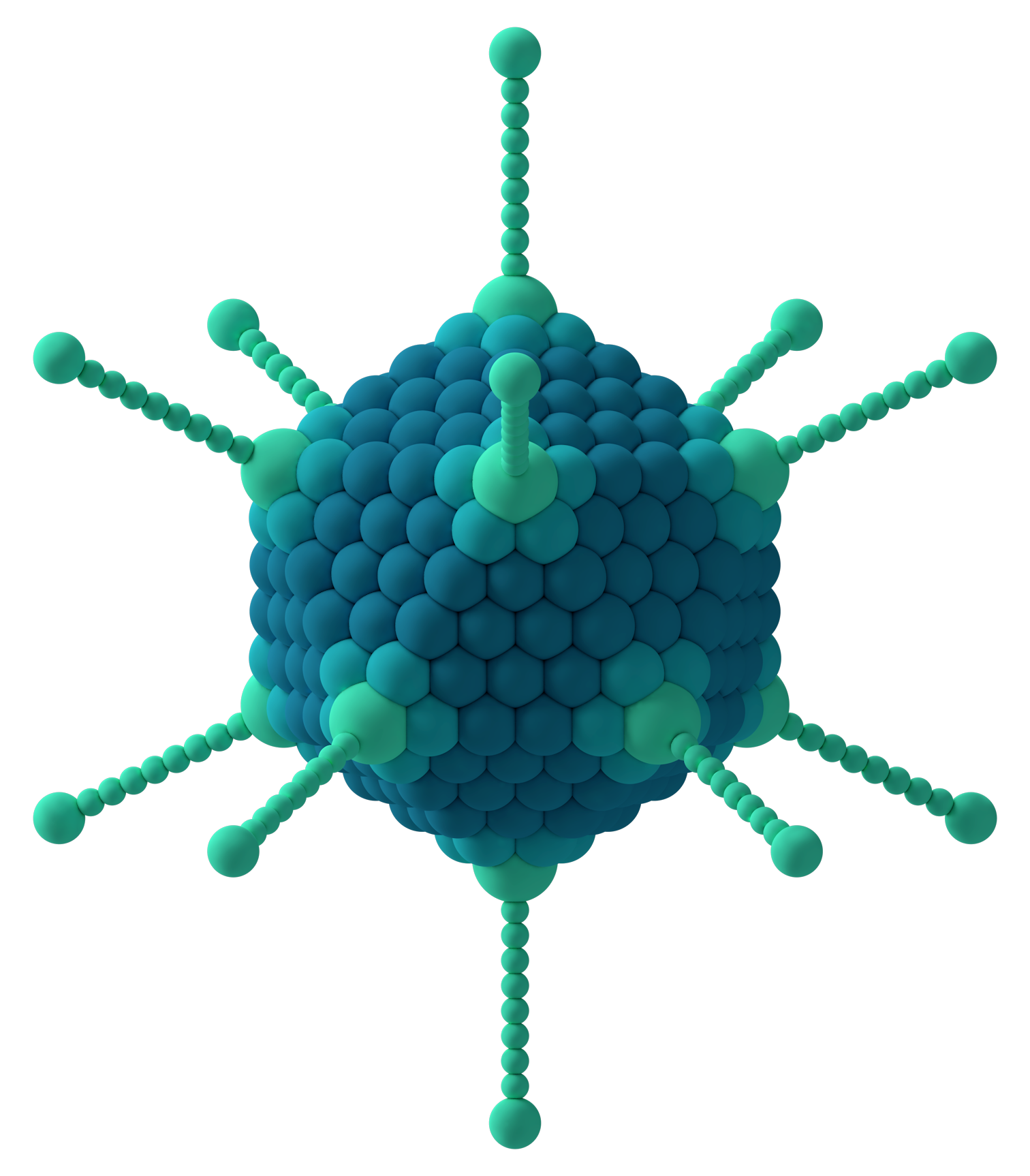
Icosahedral capsid of an adenovirus

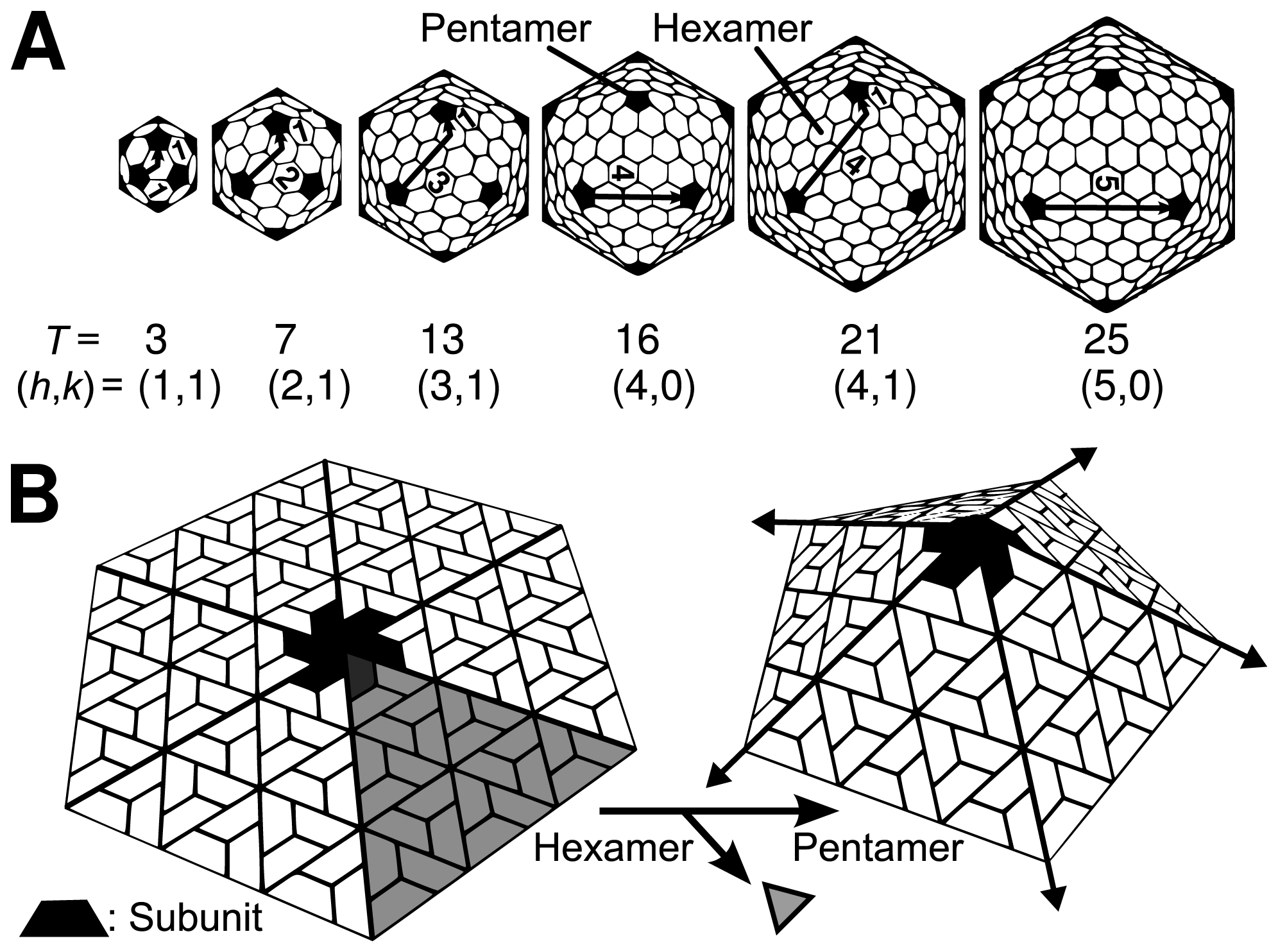
Virus capsid T-numbers

The icosahedral structure is extremely common among viruses. The icosahedron consists of 20 triangular faces delimited by 12 fivefold vertexes and consists of 60 asymmetric units. Thus, an icosahedral virus is made of 60N protein subunits. The number and arrangement of capsomeres in an icosahedral capsid can be classified using the "quasi-equivalence principle" proposed by Donald Caspar and Aaron Klug. Like the Goldberg polyhedra, an icosahedral structure can be regarded as being constructed from pentamers and hexamers. The structures can be indexed by two integers h and k, with $h \ge 1$ and $k \ge 0$; the structure can be thought of as taking h steps from the edge of a pentamer, turning 60 degrees counterclockwise, then taking k steps to get to the next pentamer. The triangulation number T for the capsid is defined as:

$$T = h^2 + h \cdot k + k^2$$

In this scheme, icosahedral capsids contain 12 pentamers plus 10(T − 1) hexamers. The T-number is representative of the size and complexity of the capsids. Geometric examples for many values of h, k, and T can be found at List of geodesic polyhedra and Goldberg polyhedra.

Many exceptions to this rule exist: For example, the polyomaviruses and papillomaviruses have pentamers instead of hexamers in hexavalent positions on a quasi T = 7 lattice. Members of the double-stranded RNA virus lineage, including reovirus, rotavirus and bacteriophage φ6 have capsids built of 120 copies of capsid protein, corresponding to a T = 2 capsid, or arguably a T = 1 capsid with a dimer in the asymmetric unit. Similarly, many small viruses have a pseudo T = 3 (or P = 3) capsid, which is organized according to a T = 3 lattice, but with distinct polypeptides occupying the three quasi-equivalent positions

=== Prolate ===
The prolate structure of a typical head on a bacteriophage

An elongated icosahedron is a common shape for the heads of bacteriophages. Such a structure is composed of a cylinder with a cap at either end. The cylinder is composed of 10 elongated triangular faces. The Q number (or T_{mid}), which can be any positive integer, specifies the number of triangles, composed of asymmetric subunits, that make up the 10 triangles of the cylinder. The caps are classified by the T (or T_{end}) number.

The bacterium E. coli is the host for bacteriophage T4 that has a prolate head structure. The bacteriophage encoded gp31 protein appears to be functionally homologous to E. coli chaperone protein GroES and able to substitute for it in the assembly of bacteriophage T4 virions during infection. Like GroES, gp31 forms a stable complex with GroEL chaperonin that is absolutely necessary for the folding and assembly in vivo of the bacteriophage T4 major capsid protein gp23.

=== Helical ===
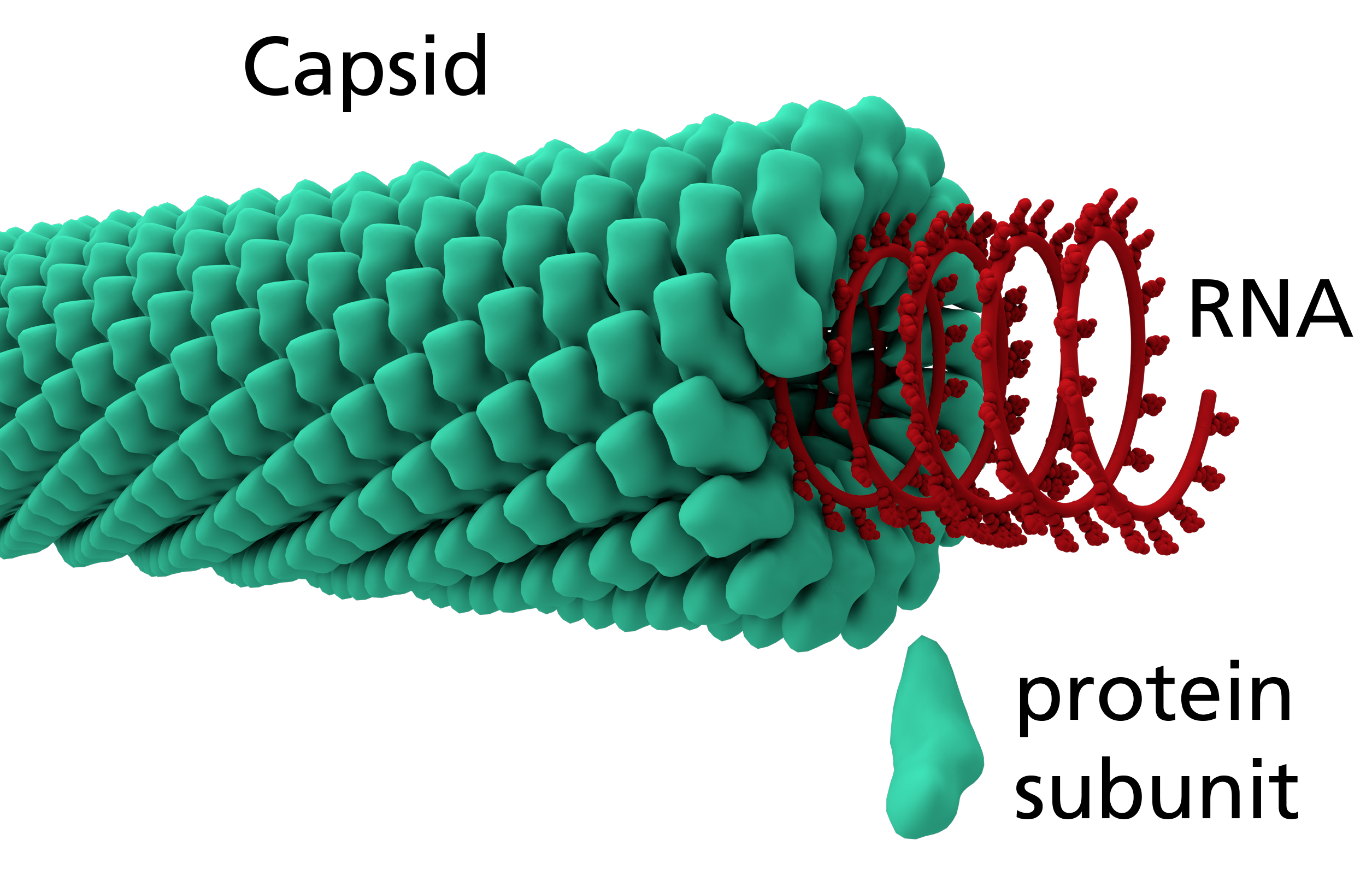
3D model of a helical capsid structure of a virus

Many rod-shaped and filamentous plant viruses have capsids with helical symmetry. The helical structure can be described as a set of n 1-D molecular helices related by an n-fold axial symmetry. The helical transformation are classified into two categories: one-dimensional and two-dimensional helical systems. Creating an entire helical structure relies on a set of translational and rotational matrices which are coded in the protein data bank. Helical symmetry is given by the formula P = μ x ρ, where μ is the number of structural units per turn of the helix, ρ is the axial rise per unit and P is the pitch of the helix. The structure is said to be open due to the characteristic that any volume can be enclosed by varying the length of the helix. The most understood helical virus is the tobacco mosaic virus. The virus is a single molecule of (+) strand RNA. Each coat protein on the interior of the helix binds three nucleotides of the RNA genome, with the overall polymer having a μ value of 16.33 protein subunits per helical turn. Influenza A viruses differ by comprising multiple ribonucleoproteins which organize the segmented RNA into double helical structures.

== Functions ==
The functions of the capsid are to:

- protect the genome,
- deliver the genome, and
- interact with the host.

The virus must assemble a stable, protective protein shell to protect the genome from lethal chemical and physical agents. These include extremes of pH or temperature and proteolytic and nucleolytic enzymes. For non-enveloped viruses, the capsid itself may be involved in interaction with receptors on the host cell, leading to penetration of the host cell membrane and internalization of the capsid. Delivery of the genome occurs by subsequent uncoating or disassembly of the capsid and release of the genome into the cytoplasm, or by ejection of the genome through a specialized portal structure directly into the host cell nucleus.

== Origin and evolution ==
It has been suggested that many viral capsid proteins have evolved on multiple occasions from functionally diverse cellular proteins. The recruitment of cellular proteins appears to have occurred at different stages of evolution so that some cellular proteins were captured and refunctionalized prior to the divergence of cellular organisms into the three contemporary domains of life, whereas others were hijacked relatively recently. As a result, some capsid proteins are widespread in viruses infecting distantly related organisms (e.g., capsid proteins with the jelly-roll fold), whereas others are restricted to a particular group of viruses (e.g., capsid proteins of alphaviruses).

A computational model (2015) has shown that capsids may have originated before viruses and that they served as a means of horizontal transfer between replicator communities since these communities could not survive if the number of gene parasites increased, with certain genes being responsible for the formation of these structures and those that favored the survival of self-replicating communities. The displacement of these ancestral genes between cellular organisms could favor the appearance of new viruses during evolution.

== See also ==
- Geodesic polyhedron
- Goldberg–Coxeter construction
- Fullerene#Other buckyballs
