= List of geodesic polyhedra and Goldberg polyhedra =

This is a list of selected geodesic polyhedra and Goldberg polyhedra, two infinite classes of polyhedra. Geodesic polyhedra and Goldberg polyhedra are duals of each other. The geodesic and Goldberg polyhedra are parameterized by integers m and n, with $m > 0$ and $n \ge 0$. T is the triangulation number, which is equal to $T = m^2 + mn + n^2$.

== Icosahedral ==
m	n	T	Class	Vertices (geodesic) Faces (Goldberg)	Edges	Faces (geodesic) Vertices (Goldberg)	Face triangle	Geodesic			Goldberg		
m	n	T	Class	Vertices (geodesic) Faces (Goldberg)	Edges	Faces (geodesic) Vertices (Goldberg)	Face triangle	Symbols	Conway	Image	Symbols	Conway	Image
1	0	1	I	12	30	20		{3,5} {3,5+}_{1,0}	I		{5,3} {5+,3}_{1,0} GP_{5}(1,0)	D	
2	0	4	I	42	120	80		{3,5+}_{2,0}	uI dcdI		{5+,3}_{2,0} GP_{5}(2,0)	cD cD	
3	0	9	I	92	270	180		{3,5+}_{3,0}	xI ktI		{5+,3}_{3,0} GP_{5}(3,0)	yD tkD	
4	0	16	I	162	480	320		{3,5+}_{4,0}	uuI dccD		{5+,3}_{4,0} GP_{5}(4,0)	c^{2}D	
5	0	25	I	252	750	500		{3,5+}_{5,0}	u5I u5I		{5+,3}_{5,0} GP_{5}(5,0)	c5D du5I	
6	0	36	I	362	1080	720		{3,5+}_{6,0}	uxI dctkdI		{5+,3}_{6,0} GP_{5}(6,0)	cyD ctkD	
7	0	49	I	492	1470	980		{3,5+}_{7,0}	vv̅I dwrwdI		{5+,3}_{7,0} GP_{5}(7,0)	ww̅D wrwD	
8	0	64	I	642	1920	1280		{3,5+}_{8,0}	u^{3}I dcccdI		{5+,3}_{8,0} GP_{5}(8,0)	cccD	
9	0	81	I	812	2430	1620		{3,5+}_{9,0}	xxI ktktI		{5+,3}_{9,0} GP_{5}(9,0)	yyD tktkD	
10	0	100	I	1002	3000	2000		{3,5+}_{10,0}	uu5I uu5I		{5+,3}_{10,0} GP_{5}(10,0)	cc5D cdu5I	
11	0	121	I	1212	3630	2420		{3,5+}_{11,0}	u11I u11I		{5+,3}_{11,0} GP_{5}(11,0)	c11D	
12	0	144	I	1442	4320	2880		{3,5+}_{12,0}	uuxD dcctkD		{5+,3}_{12,0} GP_{5}(12,0)	ccyD cctkD	
13	0	169	I	1692	5070	3380		{3,5+}_{13,0}	u13I u13I		{5+,3}_{13,0} GP_{5}(13,0)	c13D	
14	0	196	I	1962	5880	3920		{3,5+}_{14,0}	uvv̅I dcww̅dI		{5+,3}_{14,0} GP_{5}(14,0)	cwrwD	
15	0	225	I	2252	6750	4500		{3,5+}_{15,0}	u5xI u5ktI		{5+,3}_{15,0} GP_{5}(15,0)	c5yD c5tkD du5ktI	
16	0	256	I	2562	7680	5120		{3,5+}_{16,0}	dc^{4}dI		{5+,3}_{16,0} GP_{5}(16,0)	ccccD	
17	0	289	I	2892	8670	5780		{3,5+}_{17,0}	u17I		{5+,3}_{17,0} GP_{5}(17,0)	c17D	
18	0	324	I	3242	9720	6480		{3,5+}_{18,0}	u18I		{5+,3}_{18,0} GP_{5}(18,0)	c18D	
19	0	361	I	3612	10830	7220		{3,5+}_{19,0}	u19I		{5+,3}_{19,0} GP_{5}(19,0)	c19D	
20	0	400	I	4002	12000	8000		{3,5+}_{20,0}	u20I		{5+,3}_{20,0} GP_{5}(20,0)	c20D	
1	1	3	II	32	90	60		{3,5+}_{1,1}	nI kD		{5+,3}_{1,1} GP_{5}(1,1)	yD tI	
2	2	12	II	122	360	240		{3,5+}_{2,2}	unI =dctI		{5+,3}_{2,2} GP_{5}(2,2)	czD cdkD	
3	3	27	II	272	810	540		{3,5+}_{3,3}	xnI ktkD		{5+,3}_{3,3} GP_{5}(3,3)	yzD tkdkD	
4	4	48	II	482	1440	960		{3,5+}_{4,4}	u^{2}nI dcctI		{5+,3}_{4,4} GP_{5}(4,4)	c^{2}zD cctI	
5	5	75	II	752	2250	1500		{3,5+}_{5,5}	u5nI		{5+,3}_{5,5} GP_{5}(5,5)	c5zD	
6	6	108	II	1082	3240	2160		{3,5+}_{6,6}	uxnI dctktI		{5+,3}_{6,6} GP_{5}(6,6)	cyzD ctkdkD	
7	7	147	II	1472	4410	2940		{3,5+}_{7,7}	vv̅nI dwrwtI		{5+,3}_{7,7} GP_{5}(7,7)	ww̅zD wrwdkD	
8	8	192	II	1922	5760	3840		{3,5+}_{8,8}	u^{3}nI dccckD		{5+,3}_{8,8} GP_{5}(8,8)	c^{3}zD ccctI	
9	9	243	II	2432	7290	4860		{3,5+}_{9,9}	xxnI ktktkD		{5+,3}_{9,9} GP_{5}(9,9)	yyzD tktktI	
12	12	432	II	4322	12960	8640		{3,5+}_{12,12}	uuxnI dccdktkD		{5+,3}_{12,12} GP_{5}(12,12)	ccyzD cckttI	
14	14	588	II	5882	17640	11760		{3,5+}_{14,14}	uvv̅nI dcww̅kD		{5+,3}_{14,14} GP_{5}(14,14)	cww̅zD cwrwtI	
16	16	768	II	7682	23040	15360		{3,5+}_{16,16}	uuuunI dcccctI		{5+,3}_{16,16} GP_{5}(16,16)	cccczD cccctI	
2	1	7	III	72	210	140		{3,5+}_{2,1}	vI dwD		{5+,3}_{2,1} GP_{5}(2,1)	wD	
3	1	13	III	132	390	260		{3,5+}_{3,1}	v3,1I		{5+,3}_{3,1} GP_{5}(3,1)	w3,1D	
3	2	19	III	192	570	380		{3,5+}_{3,2}	v3I		{5+,3}_{3,2} GP_{5}(3,2)	w3D	
4	1	21	III	212	630	420		{3,5+}_{4,1}	dwtI		{5+,3}_{4,1} GP_{5}(4,1)	wdkD	
4	2	28	III	282	840	560		{3,5+}_{4,2}	vnI dwtI		{5+,3}_{4,2} GP_{5}(4,2)	wcD	
4	3	37	III	372	1110	740		{3,5+}_{4,3}	v4I		{5+,3}_{4,3} GP_{5}(4,3)	w4D	
5	1	31	III	312	930	620		{3,5+}_{5,1}	u5,1I		{5+,3}_{5,1} GP_{5}(5,1)	w5,1D	
5	2	39	III	392	1170	780		{3,5+}_{5,2}	u5,2I		{5+,3}_{5,2} GP_{5}(5,2)	w5,2D	
5	3	49	III	492	1470	980		{3,5+}_{5,3}	vvI dwwD		{5+,3}_{5,3} GP_{5}(5,3)	wwD	
5	4	61	III	612	1830	1220		{3,5+}_{5,4}	u5,4I		{5+,3}_{5,4} GP_{5}(5,4)	w5,4D	
6	2	52	III	522	1560	1040		{3,5+}_{6,2}	v3,1uI		{5+,3}_{6,2} GP_{5}(6,2)	w3,1cD	
6	3	63	III	632	1890	1260		{3,5+}_{6,3}	vxI dwdktI		{5+,3}_{6,3} GP_{5}(6,3)	wyD wtkD	
8	2	84	III	842	2520	1680		{3,5+}_{8,2}	vunI dwctI		{5+,3}_{8,2} GP_{5}(8,2)	wczD wcdkD	
8	4	112	III	1122	3360	2240		{3,5+}_{8,4}	vuuI dwccD		{5+,3}_{8,4} GP_{5}(8,4)	wccD	
11	2	147	III	1472	4410	2940		{3,5+}_{11,2}	vvnI dwwtI		{5+,3}_{11,2} GP_{5}(11,2)	wwzD	
12	3	189	III	1892	5670	3780		{3,5+}_{12,3}	vxnI dwtktktI		{5+,3}_{12,3} GP_{5}(12,3)	wyzD wtktI	
10	6	196	III	1962	5880	3920		{3,5+}_{10,6}	vvuI dwwcD		{5+,3}_{10,6} GP_{5}(10,6)	wwcD	
12	6	252	III	2522	7560	5040		{3,5+}_{12,6}	vxuI dwctkD		{5+,3}_{12,6} GP_{5}(12,6)	cywD wctkD	
16	4	336	III	3362	10080	6720		{3,5+}_{16,4}	vuunI dwcctI		{5+,3}_{16,4} GP_{5}(16,4)	wcczD wcctI	
14	7	343	III	3432	10290	6860		{3,5+}_{14,7}	vv̅vI dwrwwD		{5+,3}_{14,7} GP_{5}(14,7)	ww̅wD wrwwD	
15	9	441	III	4412	13230	8820		{3,5+}_{15,9}	vvxI dwwtkD		{5+,3}_{15,9} GP_{5}(15,9)	wwxD wwtkD	
16	8	448	III	4482	13440	8960		{3,5+}_{16,8}	vuuuI dwcccD		{5+,3}_{16,8} GP_{5}(16,8)	wcccD	
18	1	343	III	3432	10290	6860		{3,5+}_{18,1}	vvvI dwwwD		{5+,3}_{18,1} GP_{5}(18,1)	wwwD	
18	9	567	III	5672	17010	11340		{3,5+}_{18,9}	vxxI dwtktkD		{5+,3}_{18,9} GP_{5}(18,9)	wyyD wtktkD	
20	12	784	III	7842	23520	15680		{3,5+}_{20,12}	vvuuI dwwccD		{5+,3}_{20,12} GP_{5}(20,12)	wwccD	
20	17	1029	III	10292	30870	20580		{3,5+}_{20,17}	vvvnI dwwwtI		{5+,3}_{20,17} GP_{5}(20,17)	wwwzD wwwdkD	
28	7	1029	III	10292	30870	20580		{3,5+}_{28,7}	vv̅vnI dwrwwdkD		{5+,3}_{28,7} GP_{5}(28,7)	ww̅wzD wrwwdkD	

== Octahedral ==
m	n	T	Class	Vertices (geodesic) Faces (Goldberg)	Edges	Faces (geodesic) Vertices (Goldberg)	Face triangle	Geodesic			Goldberg		
m	n	T	Class	Vertices (geodesic) Faces (Goldberg)	Edges	Faces (geodesic) Vertices (Goldberg)	Face triangle	Symbols	Conway	Image	Symbols	Conway	Image
1	0	1	I	6	12	8		{3,4} {3,4+}_{1,0}	O		{4,3} {4+,3}_{1,0} GP_{4}(1,0)	C	
2	0	4	I	18	48	32		{3,4+}_{2,0}	dcC dcC		{4+,3}_{2,0} GP_{4}(2,0)	cC cC	
3	0	9	I	38	108	72		{3,4+}_{3,0}	ktO		{4+,3}_{3,0} GP_{4}(3,0)	tkC	
4	0	16	I	66	192	128		{3,4+}_{4,0}	uuO dccC		{4+,3}_{4,0} GP_{4}(4,0)	ccC	
5	0	25	I	102	300	200		{3,4+}_{5,0}	u5O		{4+,3}_{5,0} GP_{4}(5,0)	c5C	
6	0	36	I	146	432	288		{3,4+}_{6,0}	uxO dctkdO		{4+,3}_{6,0} GP_{4}(6,0)	cyC ctkC	
7	0	49	I	198	588	392		{3,4+}_{7,0}	dwrwO		{4+,3}_{7,0} GP_{4}(7,0)	wrwO	
8	0	64	I	258	768	512		{3,4+}_{8,0}	uuuO dcccC		{4+,3}_{8,0} GP_{4}(8,0)	cccC	
9	0	81	I	326	972	648		{3,4+}_{9,0}	xxO ktktO		{4+,3}_{9,0} GP_{4}(9,0)	yyC tktkC	
1	1	3	II	14	36	24		{3,4+}_{1,1}	kC		{4+,3}_{1,1} GP_{4}(1,1)	tO	
2	2	12	II	50	144	96		{3,4+}_{2,2}	ukC dctO		{4+,3}_{2,2} GP_{4}(2,2)	czC ctO	
3	3	27	II	110	324	216		{3,4+}_{3,3}	ktkC		{4+,3}_{3,3} GP_{4}(3,3)	tktO	
4	4	48	II	194	576	384		{3,4+}_{4,4}	uunO dcctO		{4+,3}_{4,4} GP_{4}(4,4)	cczC cctO	
2	1	7	III	30	84	56		{3,4+}_{2,1}	vO dwC		{4+,3}_{2,1} GP_{4}(2,1)	wC	

== Tetrahedral ==
m	n	T	Class	Vertices (geodesic) Faces (Goldberg)	Edges	Faces (geodesic) Vertices (Goldberg)	Face triangle	Geodesic			Goldberg		
m	n	T	Class	Vertices (geodesic) Faces (Goldberg)	Edges	Faces (geodesic) Vertices (Goldberg)	Face triangle	Symbols	Conway	Image	Symbols	Conway	Image
1	0	1	I	4	6	4		{3,3} {3,3+}_{1,0}	T		{3,3} {3+,3}_{1,0} GP_{3}(1,0)	T	
1	1	3	II	8	18	12		{3,3+}_{1,1}	kT kT		{3+,3}_{1,1} GP_{3}(1,1)	tT tT	
2	0	4	I	10	24	16		{3,3+}_{2,0}	dcT dcT		{3+,3}_{2,0} GP_{3}(2,0)	cT cT	
3	0	9	I	20	54	36		{3,3+}_{3,0}	ktT		{3+,3}_{3,0} GP_{3}(3,0)	tkT	
4	0	16	I	34	96	64		{3,3+}_{4,0}	uuT dccT		{3+,3}_{4,0} GP_{3}(4,0)	ccT	
5	0	25	I	52	150	100		{3,3+}_{5,0}	u5T		{3+,3}_{5,0} GP_{3}(5,0)	c5T	
6	0	36	I	74	216	144		{3,3+}_{6,0}	uxT dctkdT		{3+,3}_{6,0} GP_{3}(6,0)	cyT ctkT	
7	0	49	I	100	294	196		{3,3+}_{7,0}	vrvT dwrwT		{3+,3}_{7,0} GP_{3}(7,0)	wrwT	
8	0	64	I	130	384	256		{3,3+}_{8,0}	u^{3}T dcccdT		{3+,3}_{8,0} GP_{3}(8,0)	c^{3}T cccT	
9	0	81	I	164	486	324		{3,3+}_{9,0}	xxT ktktT		{3+,3}_{9,0} GP_{3}(9,0)	yyT tktkT	
3	3	27	II	56	162	108		{3,3+}_{3,3}	ktkT		{3+,3}_{3,3} GP_{3}(3,3)	tktT	
2	1	7	III	16	42	28		{3,3+}_{2,1}	dwT		{3+,3}_{2,1} GP_{5}(2,1)	wT	
