= Pentakis snub dodecahedron =

Pentakis snub dodecahedron
Geodesic polyhedron	{3,5+}_{2,1}
Conway	k5sD or dwdI
Faces	140 triangles (2 different kinds: 80 equilateral, 60 isosceles)
Edges	210 (4 different kinds)
Vertices	72 (2 different kinds: 12 of valence 5 and 60 of valence 6)
Vertex configurations	(12) 3^{5} (60) 3^{6}
Symmetry group	Icosahedral (I)
Dual polyhedron	Order-5 truncated pentagonal hexecontahedron
Properties	convex, chiral
Net	(click to enlarge)

The pentakis snub dodecahedron is a convex polyhedron with 140 triangular faces, 210 edges, and 72 vertices. It has chiral icosahedral symmetry.

== Construction ==
It comes from a topological construction from the snub dodecahedron with the kis operator applied to the pentagonal faces. In this construction, all the faces are computed to be the same distance from the center. 80 of the triangles are equilateral, and 60 triangles from the pentagons are isosceles. It is a (2,1) geodesic polyhedron, made of all triangles. The path between the valence-5 vertices is two edges in a row, and then a turn and one more edge.

== See also ==
- Tetrakis snub cube k4sC
