= Order-5 truncated pentagonal hexecontahedron =

Convex polyhedron with 72 faces

Order-5 truncated pentagonal hexecontahedron
Conway	t5gD or wD
Goldberg	{5+,3}_{2,1}
Fullerene	C_{140}
Faces	72: 60 hexagons 12 pentagons
Edges	210
Vertices	140
Symmetry group	Icosahedral (I)
Dual polyhedron	Pentakis snub dodecahedron
Properties	convex, chiral
Net	

The order-5 truncated pentagonal hexecontahedron is a convex polyhedron with 72 faces: 60 hexagons and 12 pentagons triangular, with 210 edges, and 140 vertices. Its dual is the pentakis snub dodecahedron.

It is Goldberg polyhedron {5+,3}_{2,1} in the icosahedral family, with chiral symmetry. The relationship between pentagons steps into 2 hexagons away, and then a turn with one more step.

It is a Fullerene C140.

== Construction ==
It is explicitly called a pentatruncated pentagonal hexecontahedron since only the valence-5 vertices of the pentagonal hexecontahedron are truncated.

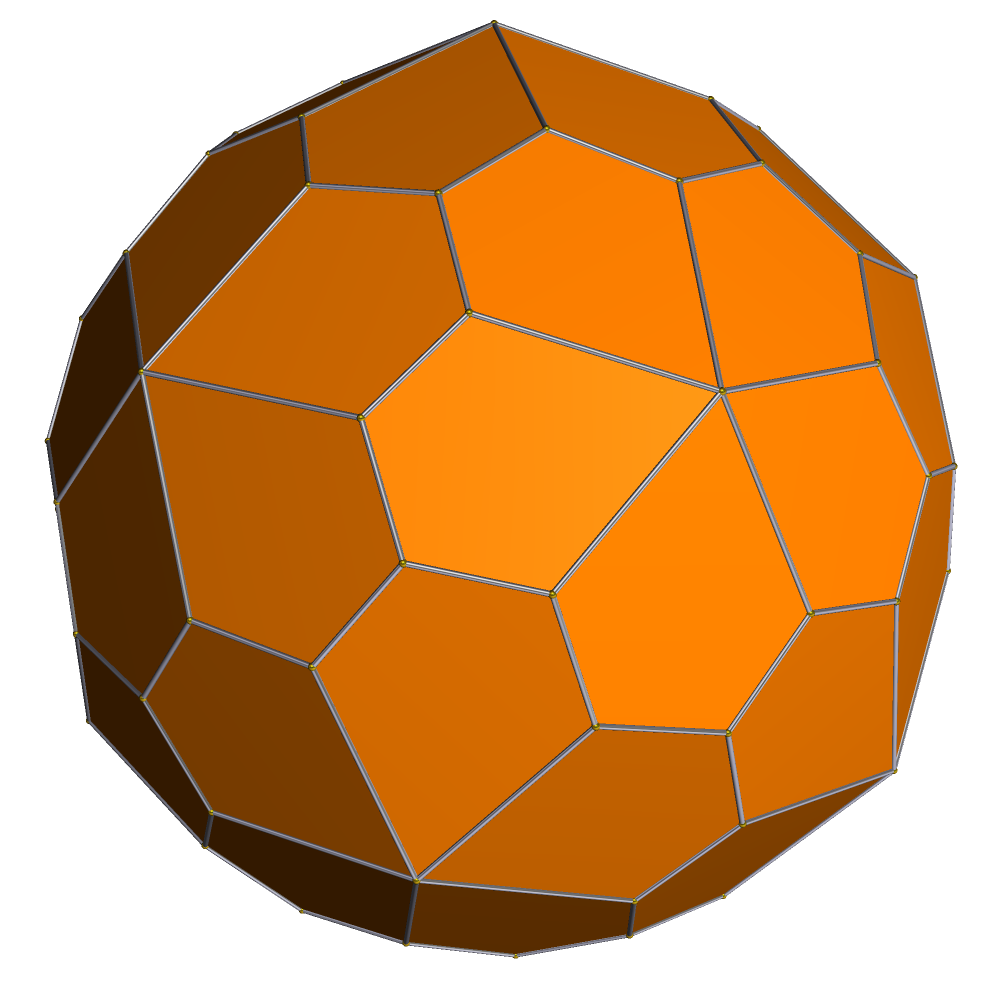

Its topology can be constructed in Conway polyhedron notation as t5gD and more simply wD as a whirled dodecahedron, reducing original pentagonal faces and adding 5 distorted hexagons around each, in clockwise or counter-clockwise forms. This picture shows its flat construction before the geometry is adjusted into a more spherical form. The snub can create a (5,3) geodesic polyhedron by k5k6.

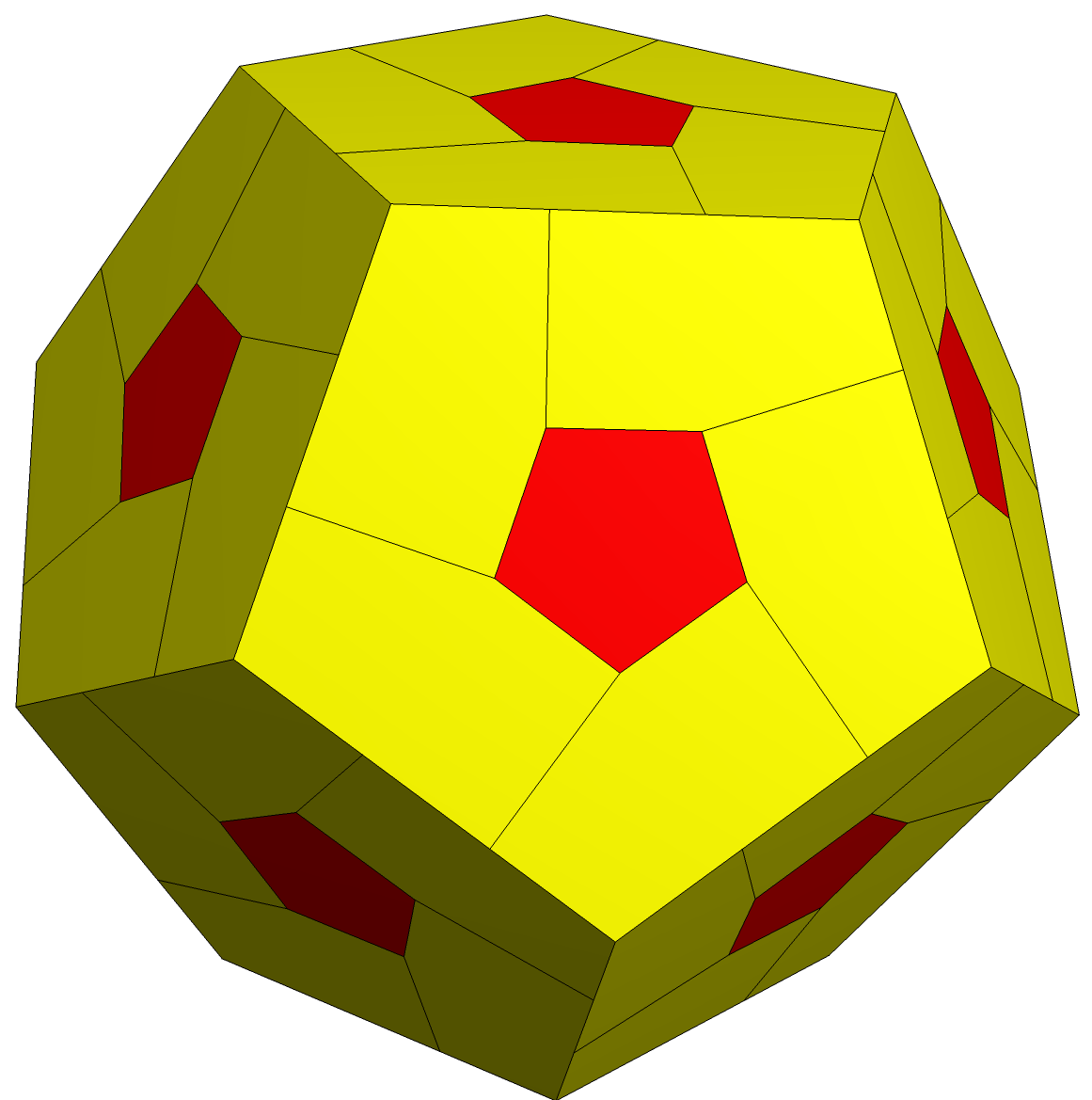

== Related polyhedra ==
The whirled dodecahedron creates more polyhedra by basic Conway polyhedron notation. The zip whirled dodecahedron makes a chamfered truncated icosahedron, and Goldberg (4,1). Whirl applied twice produces Goldberg (5,3), and applied twice with reverse orientations produces goldberg (7,0).

Whirled dodecahedron polyhedra
"seed"	ambo	truncate	zip	expand	bevel	snub	chamfer	whirl	whirl-reverse
wD = G(2,1) wD	awD awD	twD twD	zwD = G(4,1) zwD	ewD ewD	bwD bwD	swD swD	cwD = G(4,2) cwD	wwD = G(5,3) wwD	wrwD = G(7,0) wrwD
dual	join	needle	kis	ortho	medial	gyro	dual chamfer	dual whirl	dual whirl-reverse
dwD dwD	jwD jwD	nwD nwD	kwD kwD	owD owD	mwD mwD	gwD gwD	dcwD dcwD	dwwD dwwD	dwrwD dwrwD

== See also ==
- Truncated pentagonal icositetrahedron t4gC
