= Chamfer (geometry) =

Geometric operation which truncates the edges of polyhedra

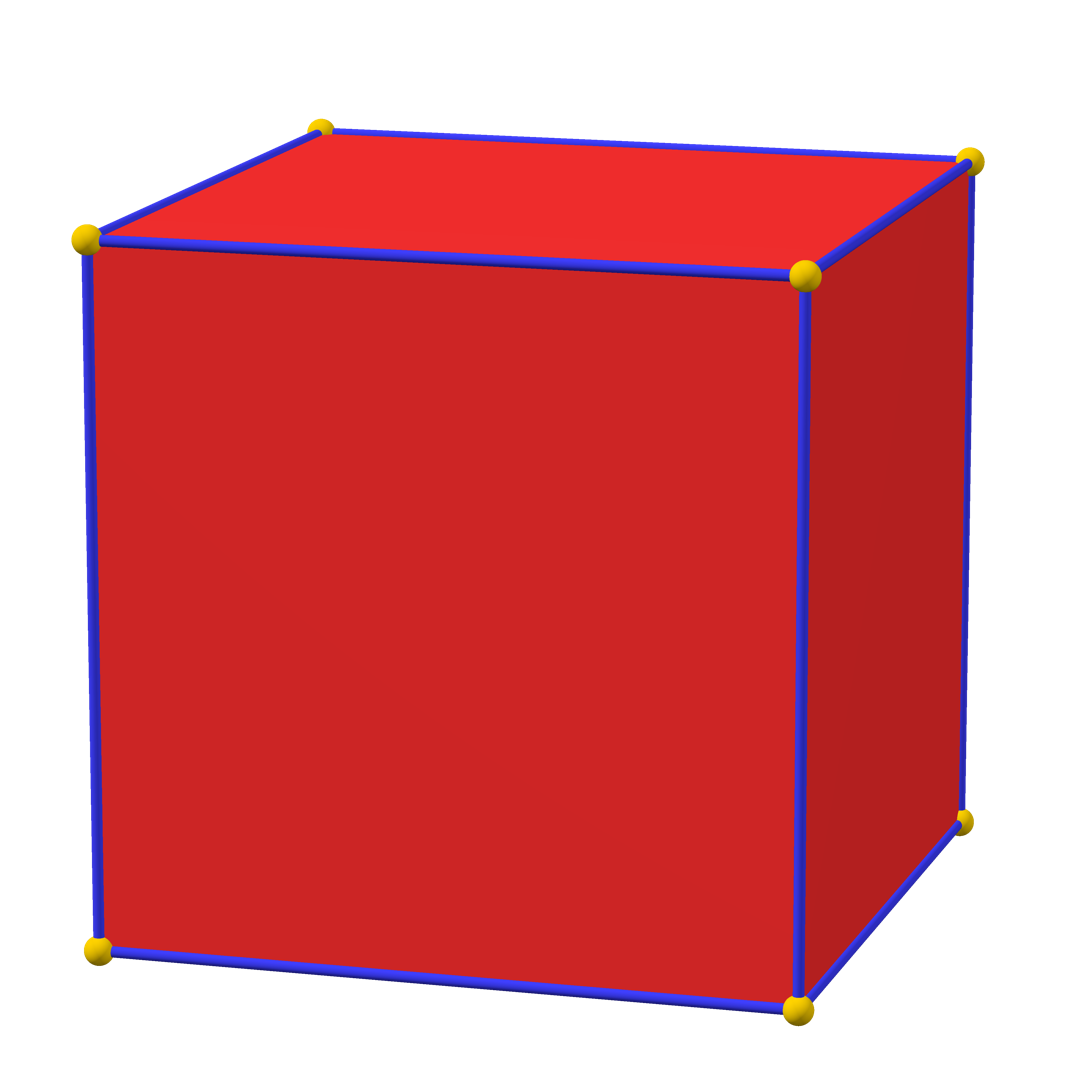
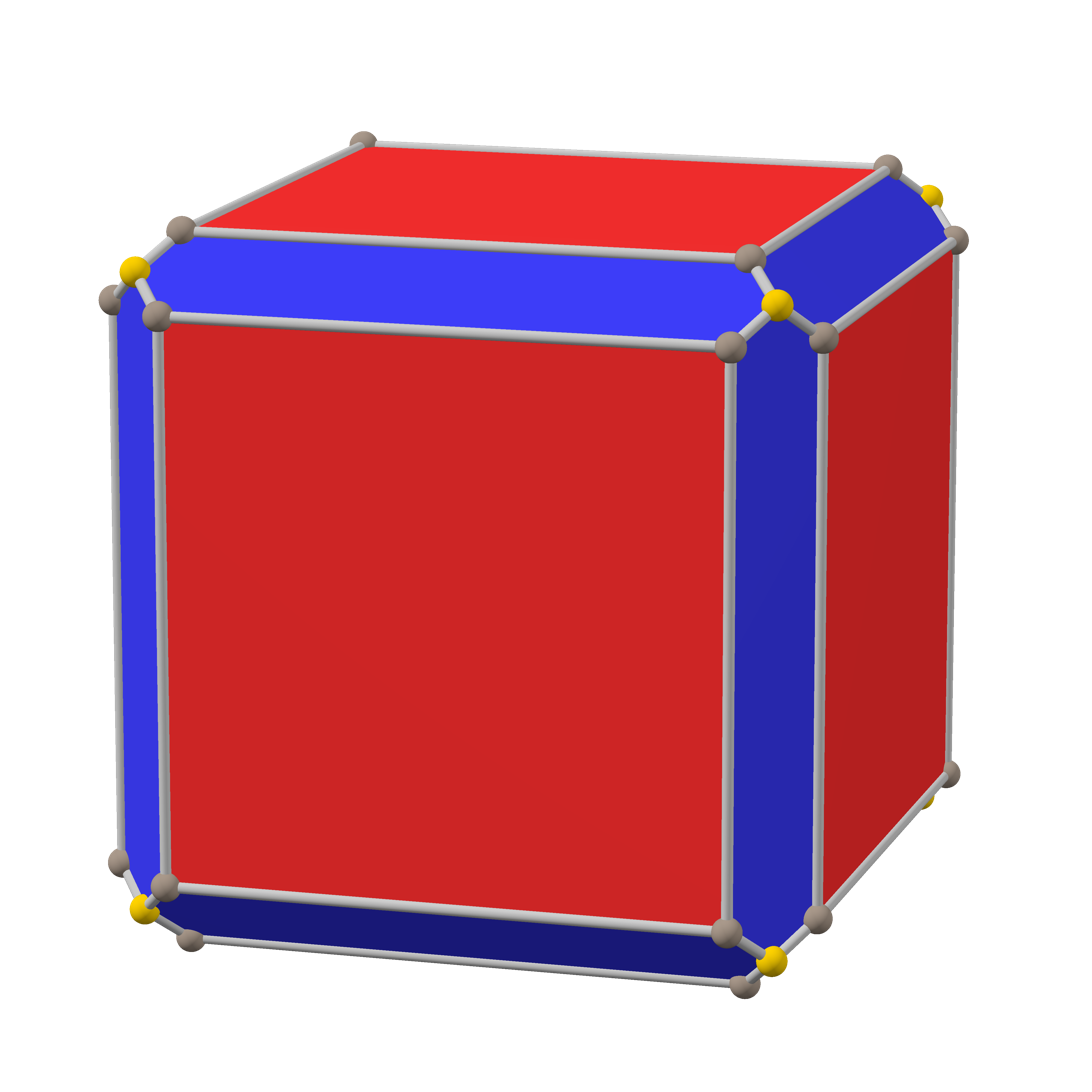
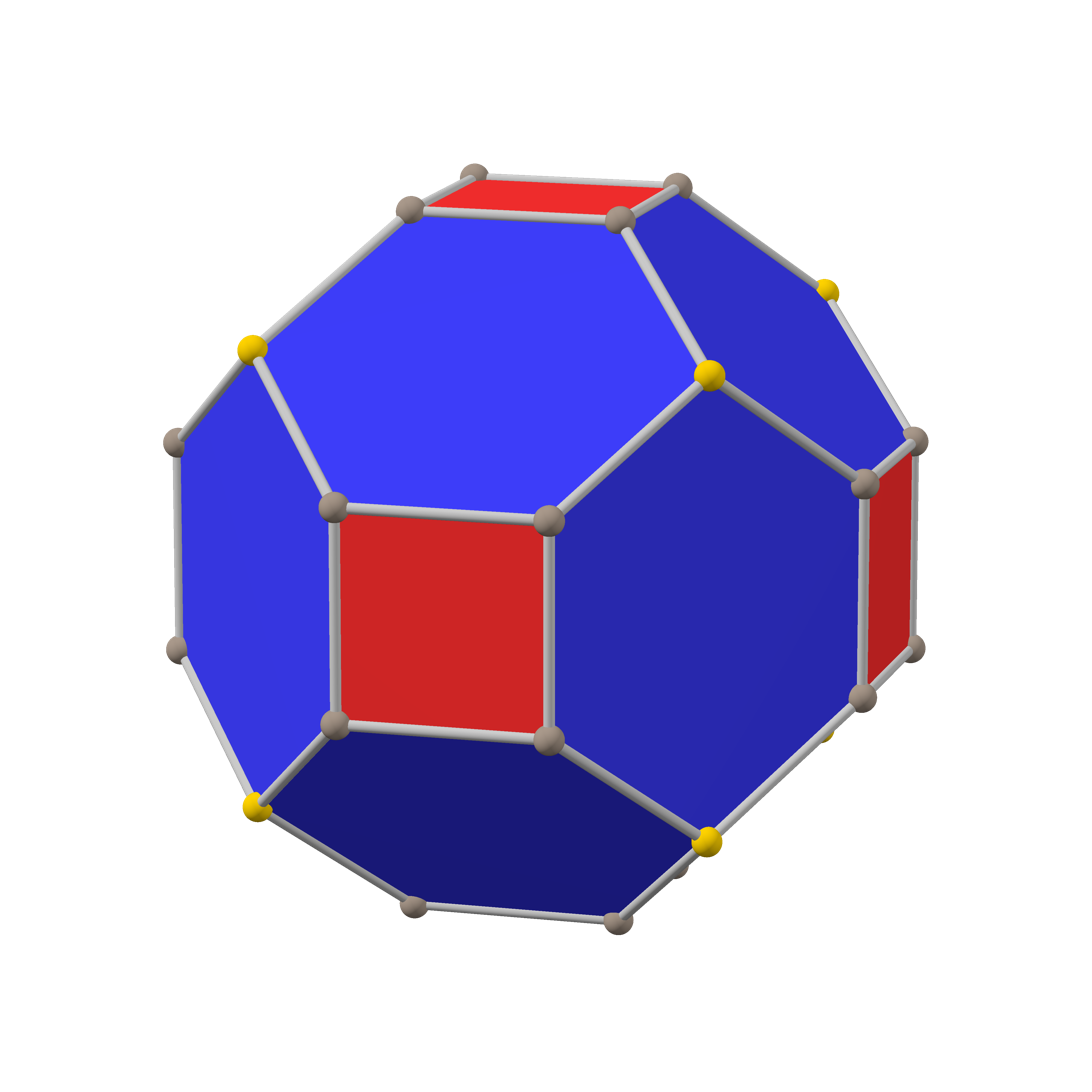
Unchamfered, slightly chamfered, and chamfered cube
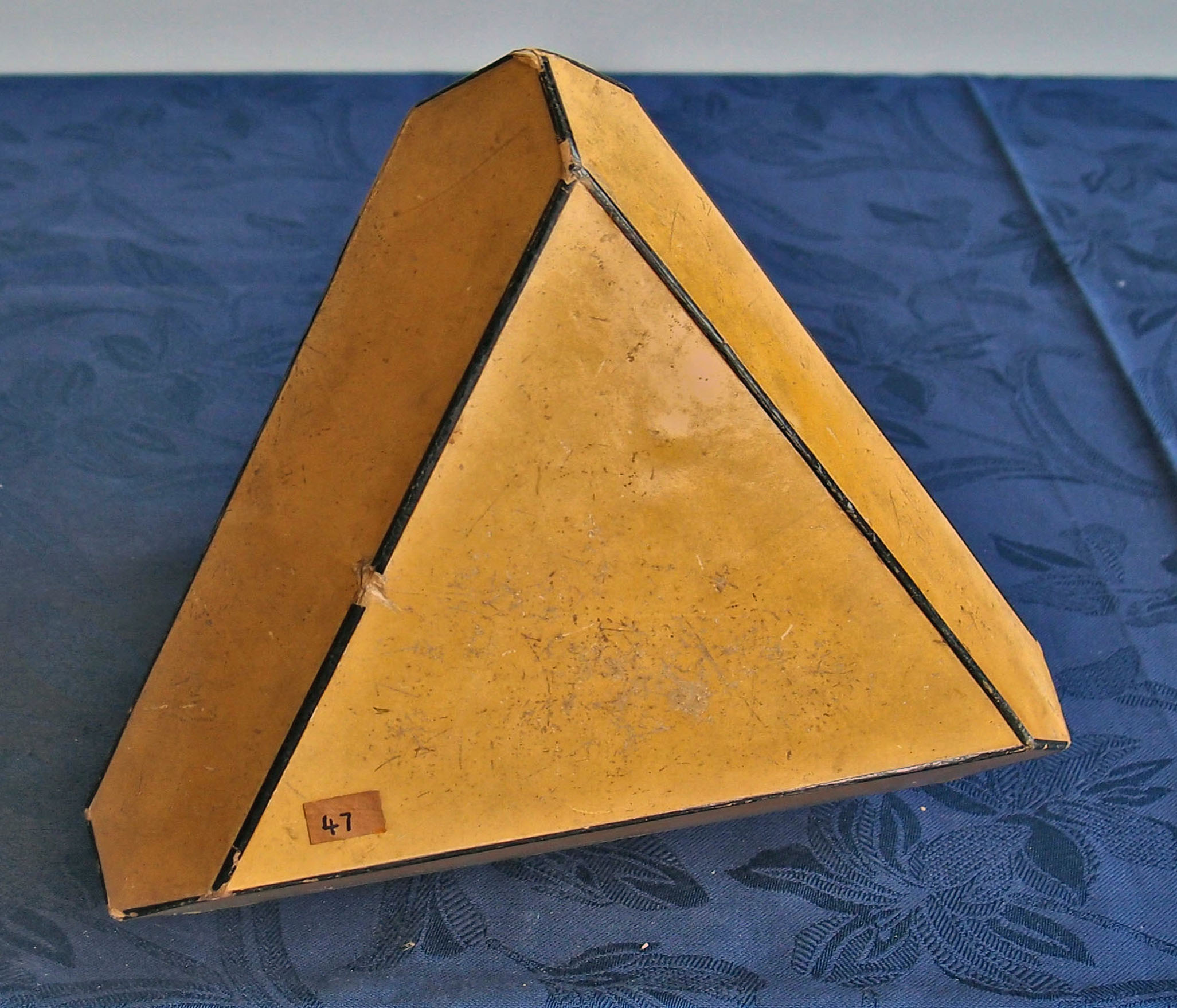
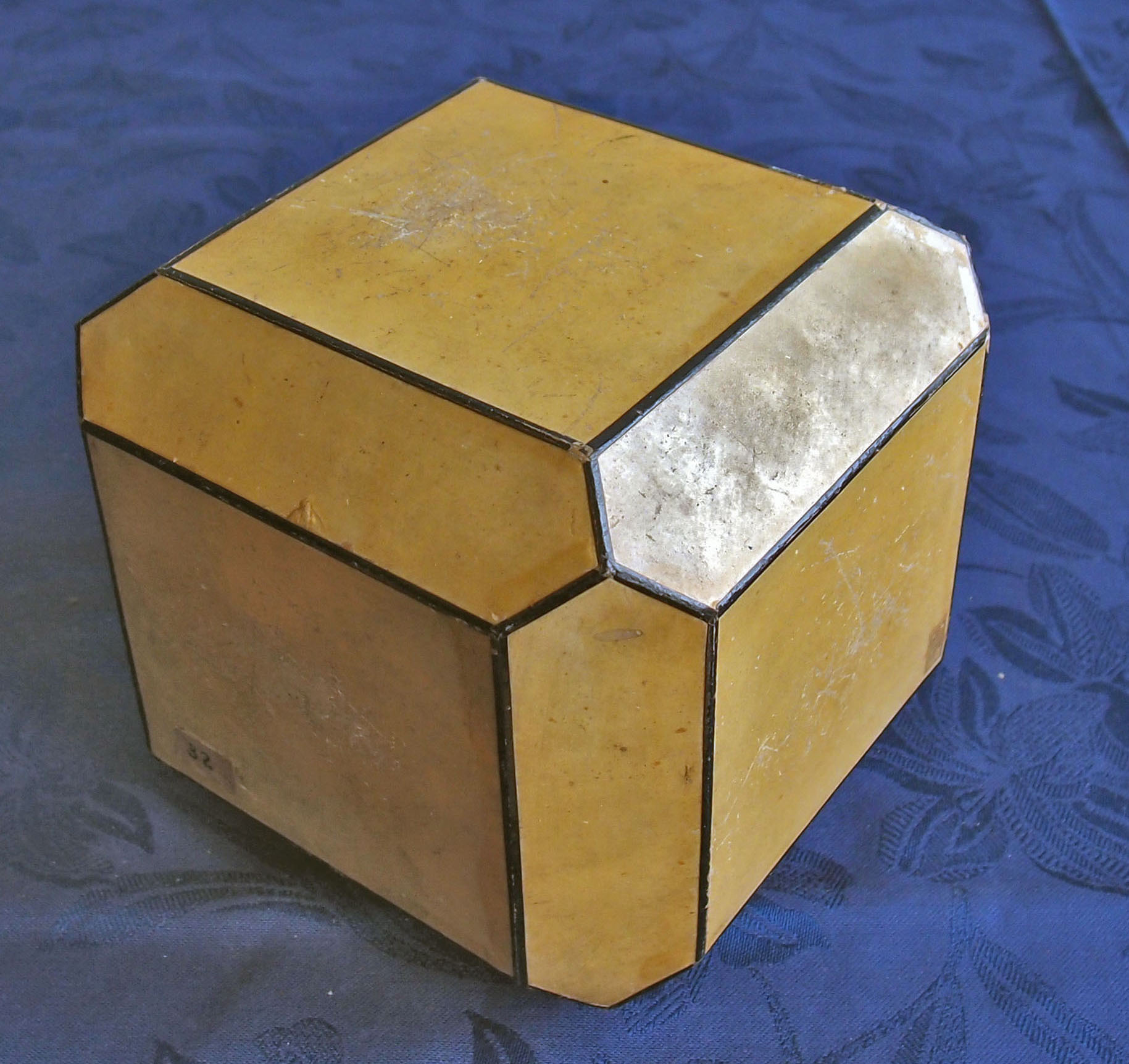
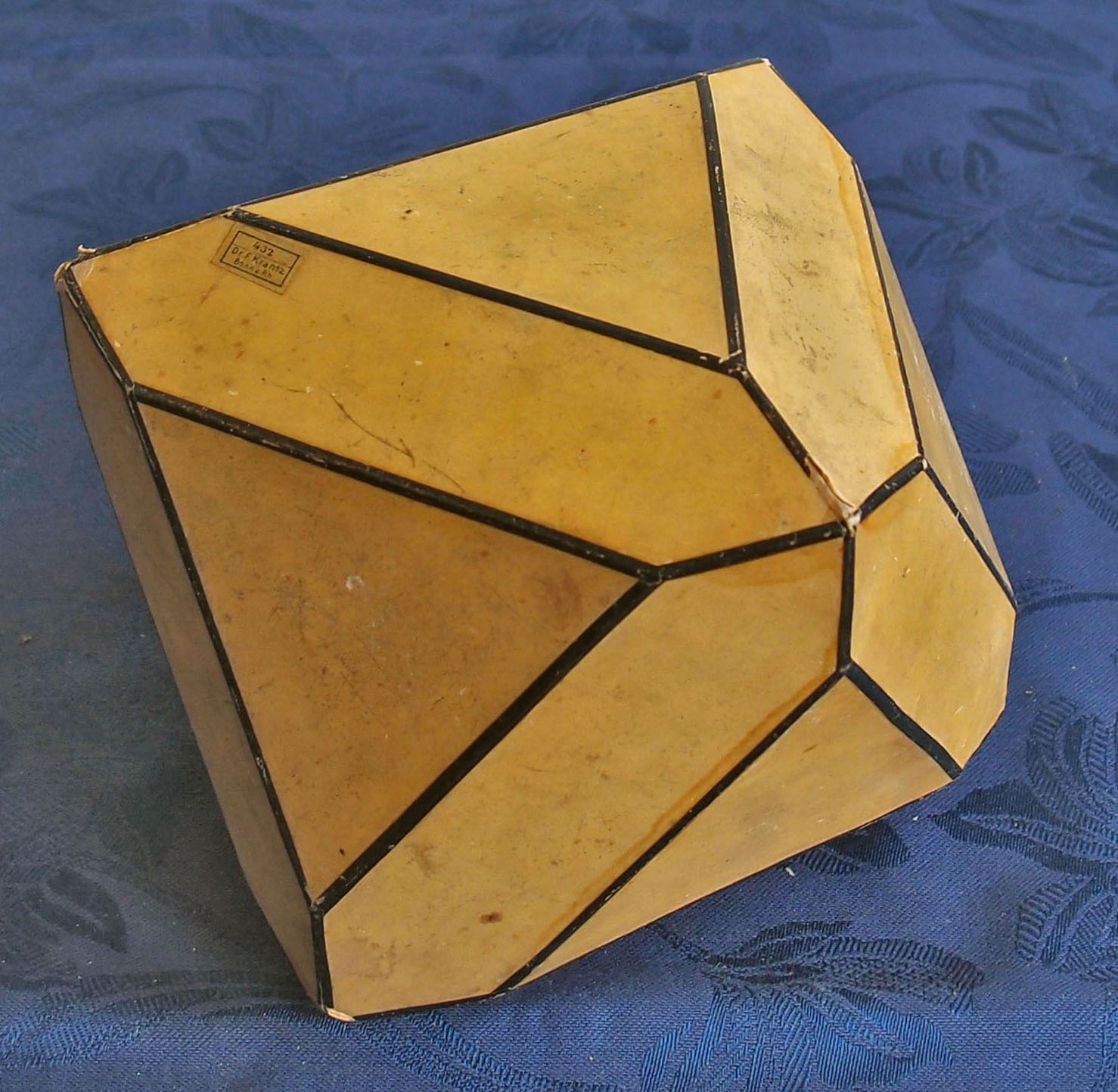
Historical crystal models of slightly chamfered Platonic solids
Transformation of a cube (left) and a regular dodecahedron (right) into their chamfered forms, with equilateral (but not equiangular) hexagons

In geometry, a chamfer or edge-truncation is a topological operator that modifies one polyhedron into another. It separates the faces by reducing them, and adds a new face between each two adjacent faces (moving the vertices inward). Oppositely, similar to expansion, it moves the faces apart outward, and adds a new face between each two adjacent faces; but contrary to expansion, it maintains the original vertices.

For a polyhedron, this operation adds a new hexagonal face in place of each original edge.

In Conway polyhedron notation, chamfering is represented by the letter "c". A polyhedron with e edges will have a chamfered form containing 2e new vertices, 3e new edges, and e new hexagonal faces.

== Platonic solids ==
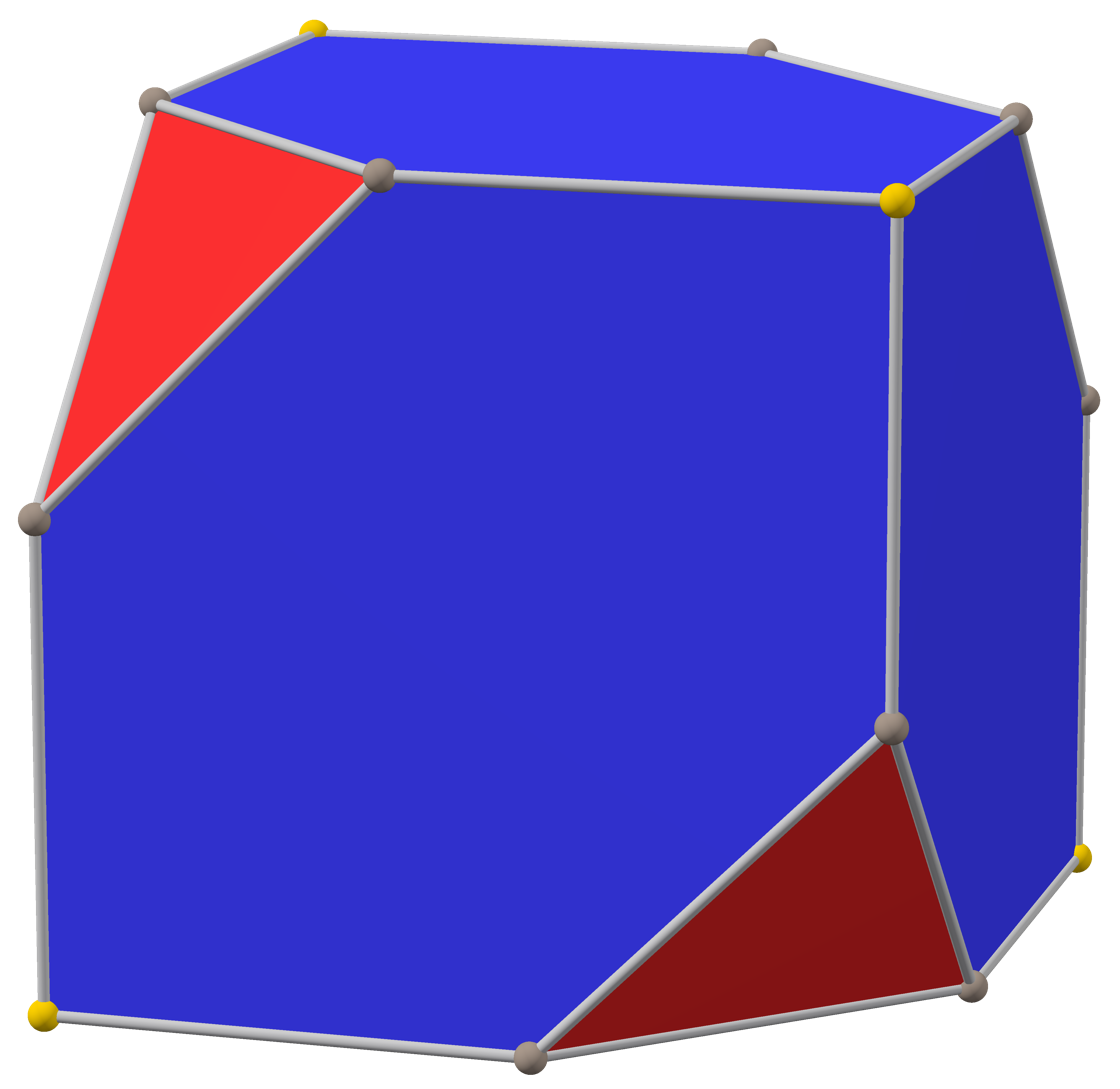
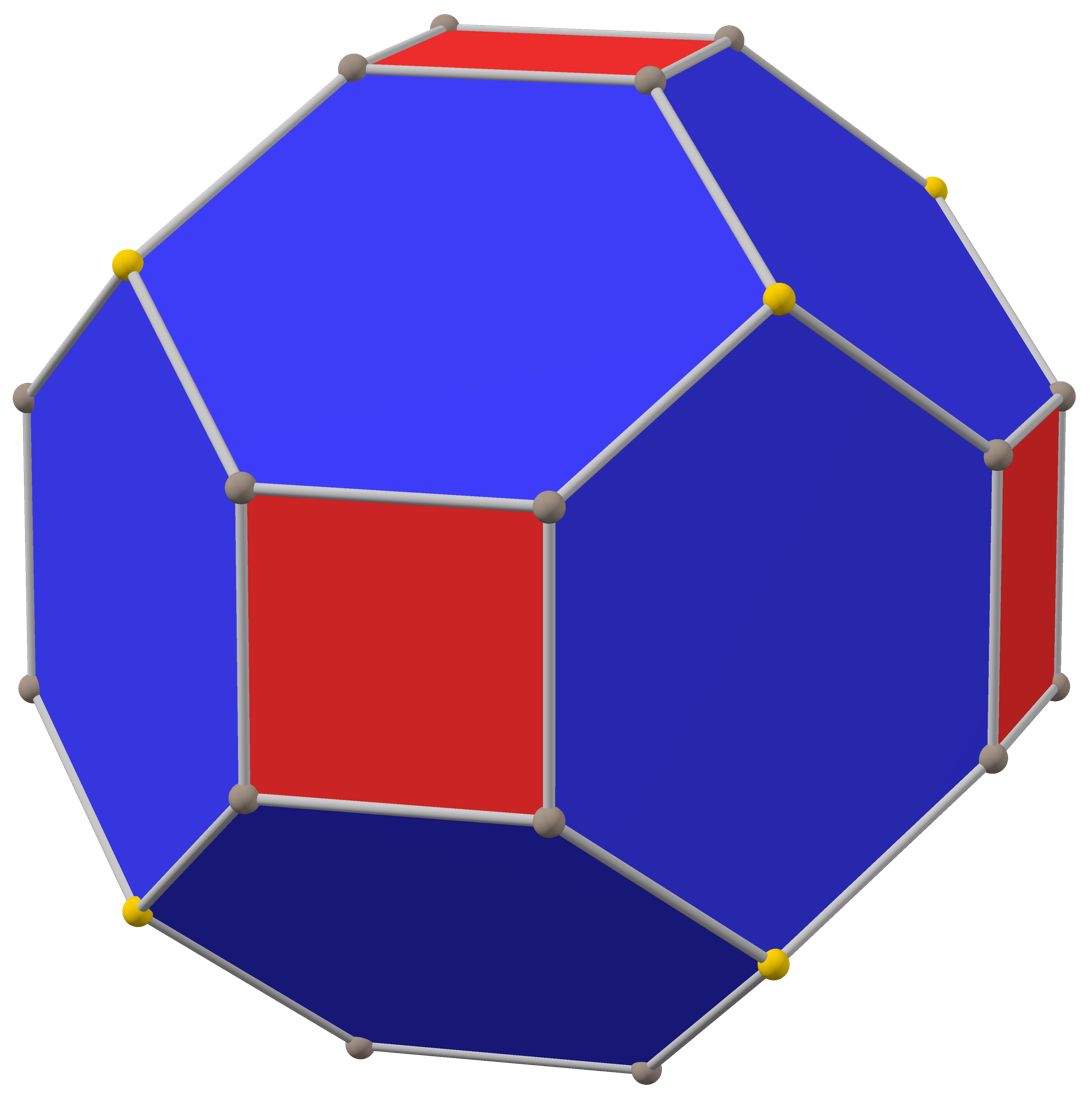
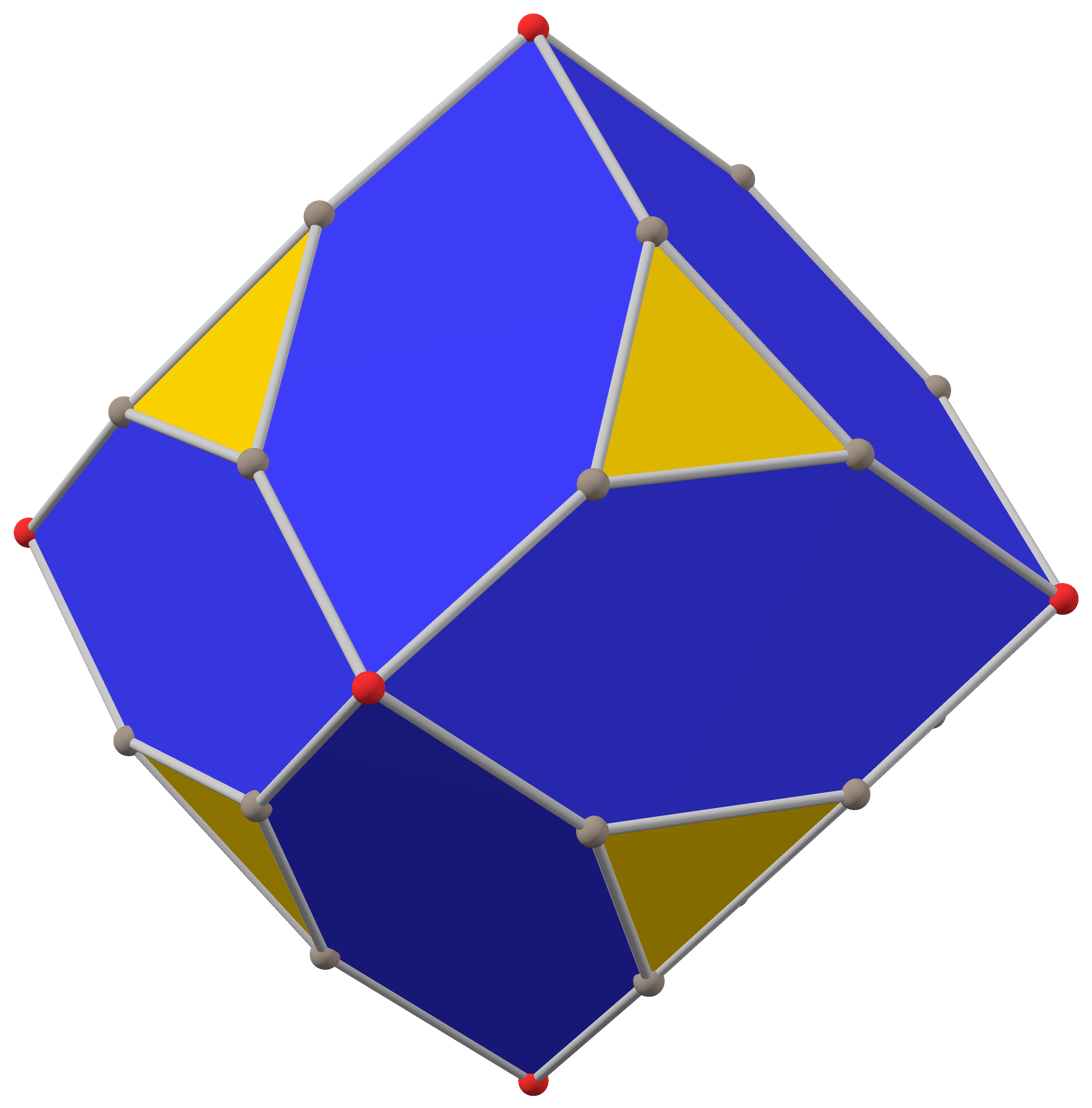
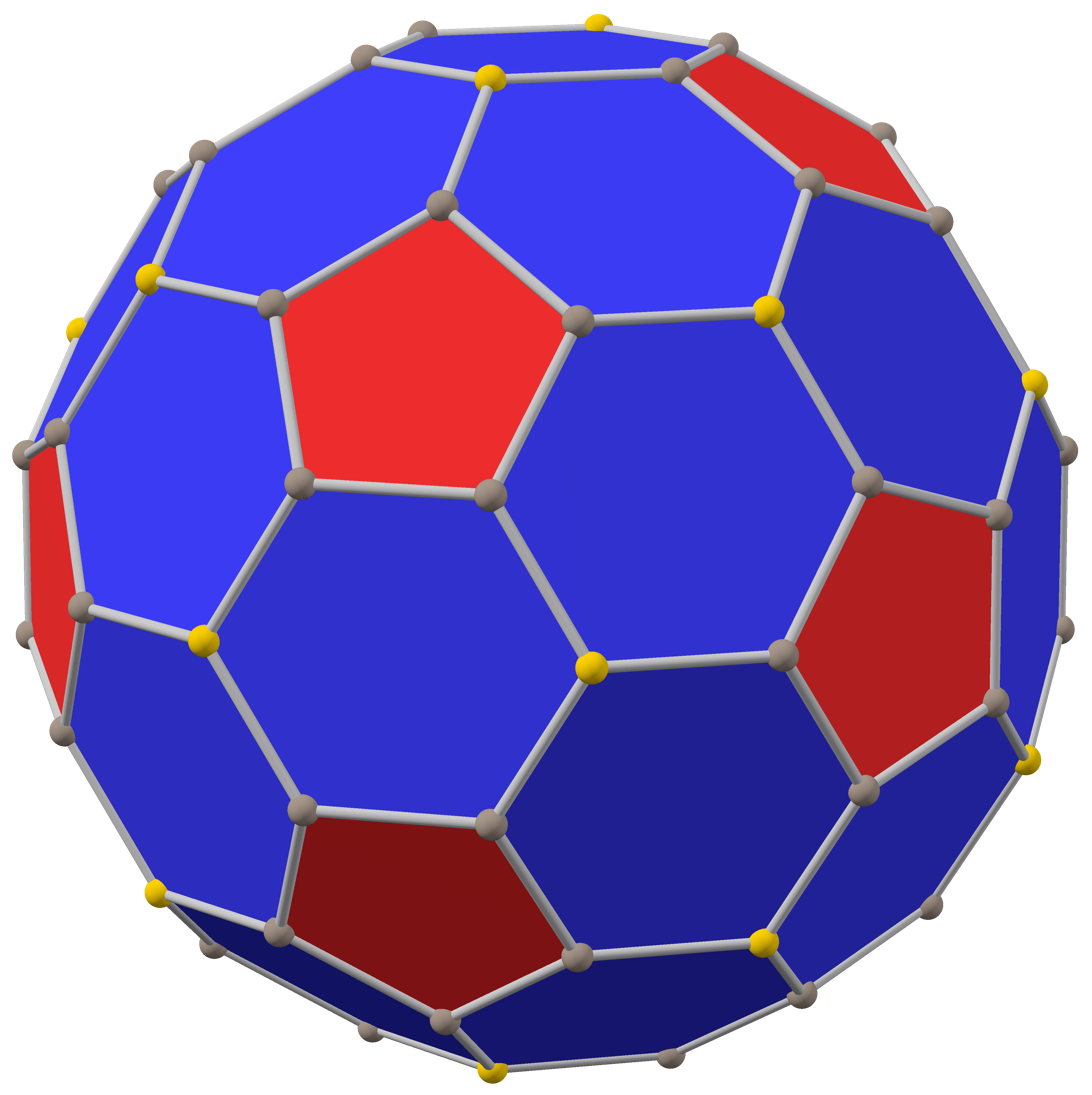
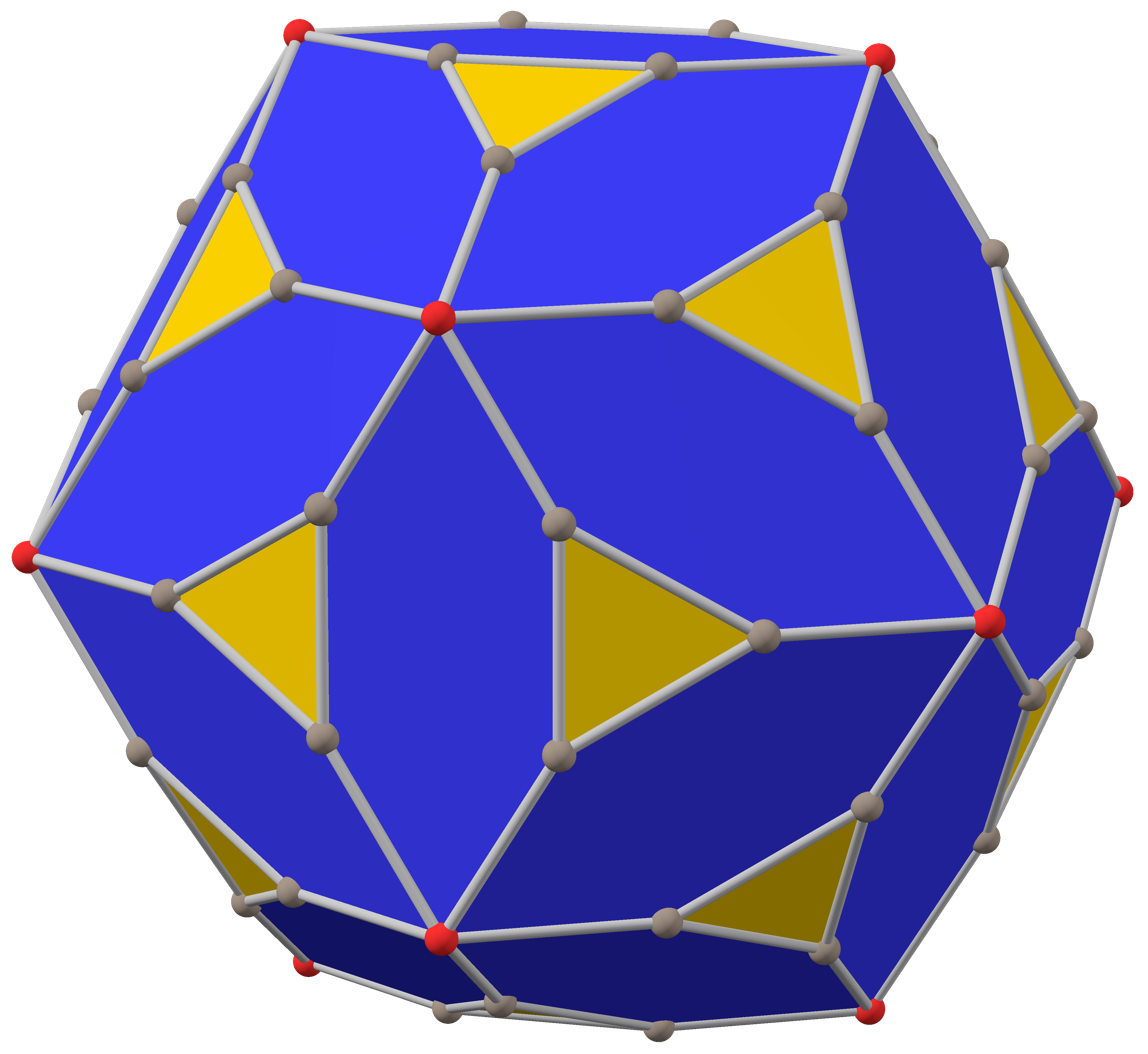
Left to right: chamfered tetrahedron, cube, octahedron, dodecahedron, and icosahedron

Chamfers of five Platonic solids are described in detail below.

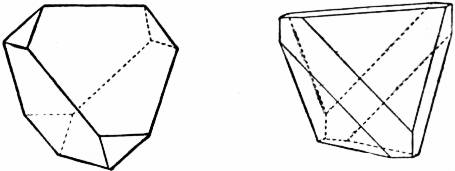
Historical drawings of truncated tetrahedron and slightly chamfered tetrahedron.

- chamfered tetrahedron or alternated truncated cube: from a regular tetrahedron, this replaces its six edges with congruent flattened hexagons; or alternately truncating a cube, replacing four of its eight vertices with congruent equilateral-triangle faces. This is an example of Goldberg polyhedron GP_{III}(2,0) or {3+,3}_{2,0}, containing triangular and hexagonal faces. Its dual is the alternate-triakis tetratetrahedron.
- chamfered cube: from a cube, the resulting polyhedron has twelve hexagonal and six square centrally symmetric faces, a zonohedron. This is also an example of the Goldberg polyhedron GP_{IV}(2,0) or {4+,3}_{2,0}. Its dual is the tetrakis cuboctahedron. The DaYan Gem 7 twisty puzzle is in the shape of a chamfered cube.
- chamfered octahedron or tritruncated rhombic dodecahedron: from a regular octahedron by chamfering, or by truncating the eight order-3 vertices of the rhombic dodecahedron, which become congruent equilateral triangles, and the original twelve rhombic faces become congruent flattened hexagons. It is a Goldberg polyhedron GP_{V}(2,0) or {5+,3}_{2,0}. Its dual is triakis cuboctahedron.
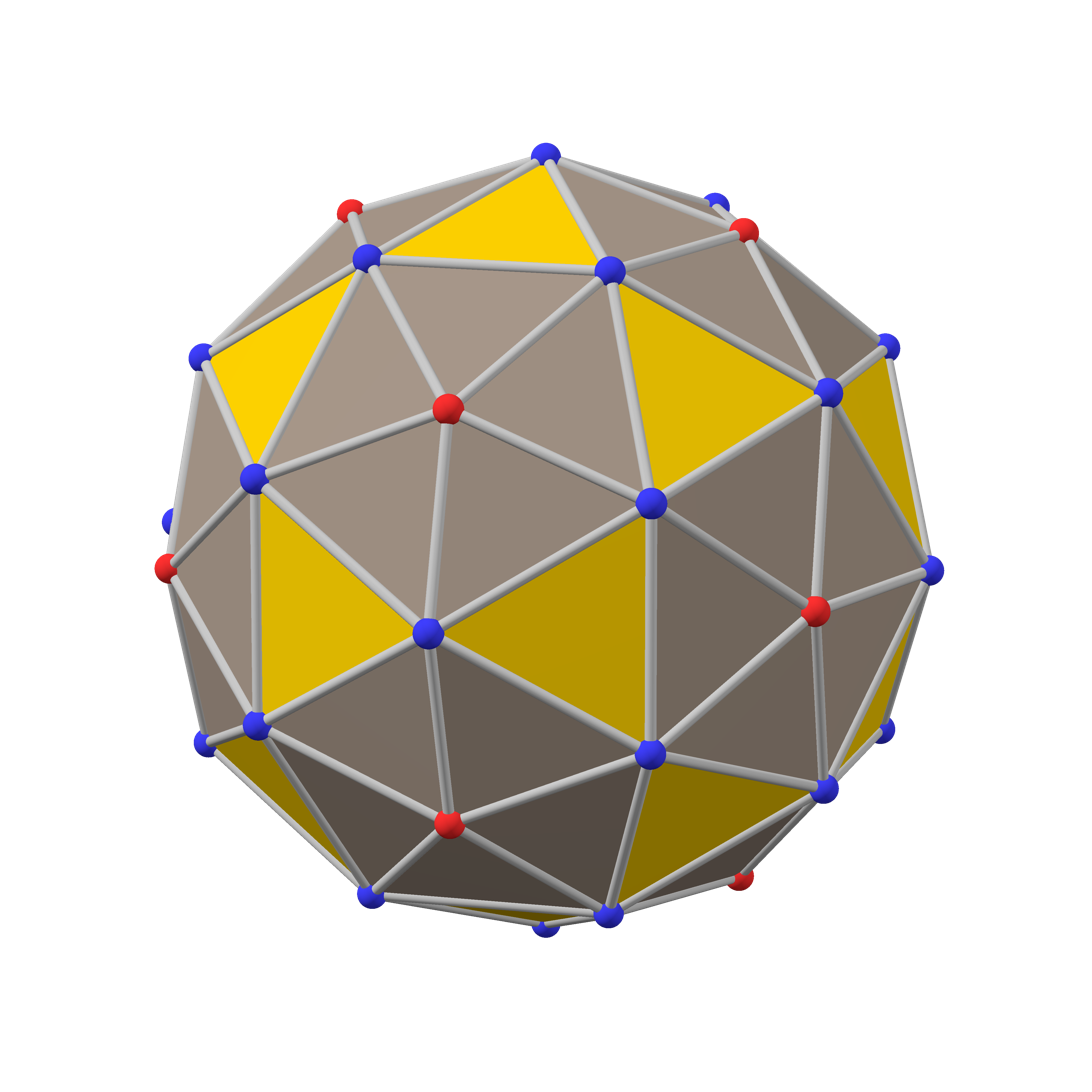
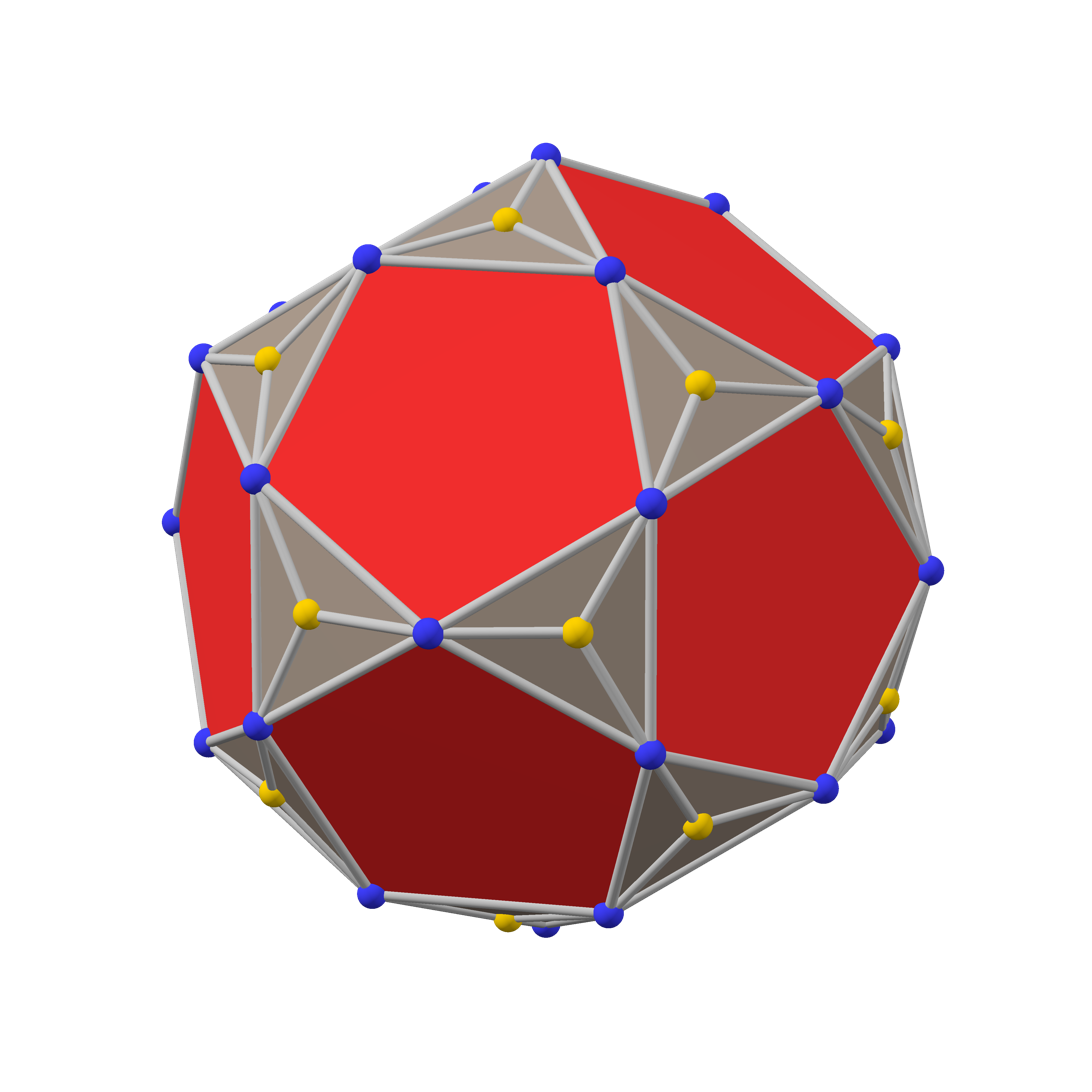
pentakis icosidodecahedron and triakis icosidodecahedron
- chamfered dodecahedron: by chamfering a regular dodecahedron, the resulting polyhedron has 80 vertices, 120 edges, and 42 faces: 12 congruent regular pentagons and 30 congruent flattened hexagons. GP_{V}(2,0) = {5+,3}_{2,0}. The structure resembles C_{60} fullerene. Its dual is the pentakis icosidodecahedron.
- chamfered icosahedron or tritruncated rhombic triacontahedron: by chamfering a regular icosahedron, or truncating the twenty order-3 vertices of the rhombic triacontahedron. The hexagonal faces of the cI can be made equilateral, but not regular, with a certain depth of truncation. Its dual is the triakis icosidodecahedron.

== Regular tilings ==
Chamfered regular and quasiregular tilings
Square tiling, Q {4,4}	Triangular tiling, Δ {3,6}	Hexagonal tiling, H {6,3}	Rhombille, daH dr{6,3}
cQ	cΔ	cH	cdaH

== Relation to Goldberg polyhedra ==
The chamfer operation applied in series creates progressively larger polyhedra with new faces, hexagonal, replacing the edges of the current one. The chamfer operator transforms GP(m,n) to GP(2m,2n).

A regular polyhedron, GP(1,0), creates a Goldberg polyhedra sequence: GP(1,0), GP(2,0), GP(4,0), GP(8,0), GP(16,0)...

	GP(1,0)	GP(2,0)	GP(4,0)	GP(8,0)	GP(16,0)	...
GP_{IV} {4+,3}	C	cC	ccC	cccC	ccccC	...
GP_{V} {5+,3}	D	cD	ccD	cccD	ccccD	...
GP_{VI} {6+,3}	H	cH	ccH	cccH	ccccH	...

The truncated octahedron or truncated icosahedron, GP(1,1), creates a Goldberg sequence: GP(1,1), GP(2,2), GP(4,4), GP(8,8)...

	GP(1,1)	GP(2,2)	GP(4,4)	...
GP_{IV} {4+,3}	tO	ctO	cctO	...
GP_{V} {5+,3}	tI	ctI	cctI	...
GP_{VI} {6+,3}	tΔ	ctΔ	cctΔ	...

A truncated tetrakis hexahedron or pentakis dodecahedron, GP(3,0), creates a Goldberg sequence: GP(3,0), GP(6,0), GP(12,0)...

	GP(3,0)	GP(6,0)	GP(12,0)	...
GP_{IV} {4+,3}	tkC	ctkC	cctkC	...
GP_{V} {5+,3}	tkD	ctkD	cctkD	...
GP_{VI} {6+,3}	tkH	ctkH	cctkH	...

== See also ==
- Cantellation (geometry)
- Conway polyhedron notation
- Near-miss Johnson solid
- Uniform 4-polytope
- Uniform polyhedron

== Sources ==
- Goldberg, Michael (1937). "A class of multi-symmetric polyhedra". Tohoku Mathematical Journal. 43: 104–108.
- Joseph D. Clinton, Clinton’s Equal Central Angle Conjecture
- Hart, George (2012). "Goldberg Polyhedra". In Senechal, Marjorie (ed.). Shaping Space (2nd ed.). Springer. pp. 125–138. doi:10.1007/978-0-387-92714-5_9. ISBN 978-0-387-92713-8.
- Hart, George (June 18, 2013). "Mathematical Impressions: Goldberg Polyhedra". Simons Science News.
- Deza, A.; Deza, M.; Grishukhin, V. (1998). "Fullerenes and coordination polyhedra versus half-cube embeddings". Discrete Mathematics. 192 (1): 41–80. doi:10.1016/S0012-365X(98)00065-X..
- Gelişgen, Özcan; Yavuz, Serhat (2019a). "A Note About Isometry Groups of Chamfered Dodecahedron and Chamfered Icosahedron Spaces" (PDF). International Journal of Geometry. 8 (2): 33–45.
- Gelişgen, Özcan; Yavuz, Serhat (2019b). "Isometry Groups of Chamfered Cube and Chamfered Octahedron Spaces". Mathematical Sciences and Applications E-Notes. 7 (2): 174–182. doi:10.36753/mathenot.542272.
- Spencer, Leonard James (1911). "Crystallography" . In Chisholm, Hugh (ed.). Encyclopædia Britannica. Vol. 07 (11th ed.). Cambridge University Press. pp. 569–591.
