= Chamfered dodecahedron =

Goldberg polyhedron with 42 faces

- Type: Goldberg polyhedron (G_{V}(2,0) = {5+,3}_{2,0}); Fullerene (C_{80}); Near-miss Johnson solid
- Faces: 12 pentagons 30 irregular hexagons
- Edges: 120 (2 types)
- Vertices: 80 (2 types)
- Vertex configuration: 60 (5.6.6); 20 (6.6.6)
- Conway notation: cD = t5daD = dk5aD
- Symmetry group: Icosahedral (I_{h})
- Dual polyhedron: Pentakis icosidodecahedron
- Properties: convex, equilateral-faced

Net
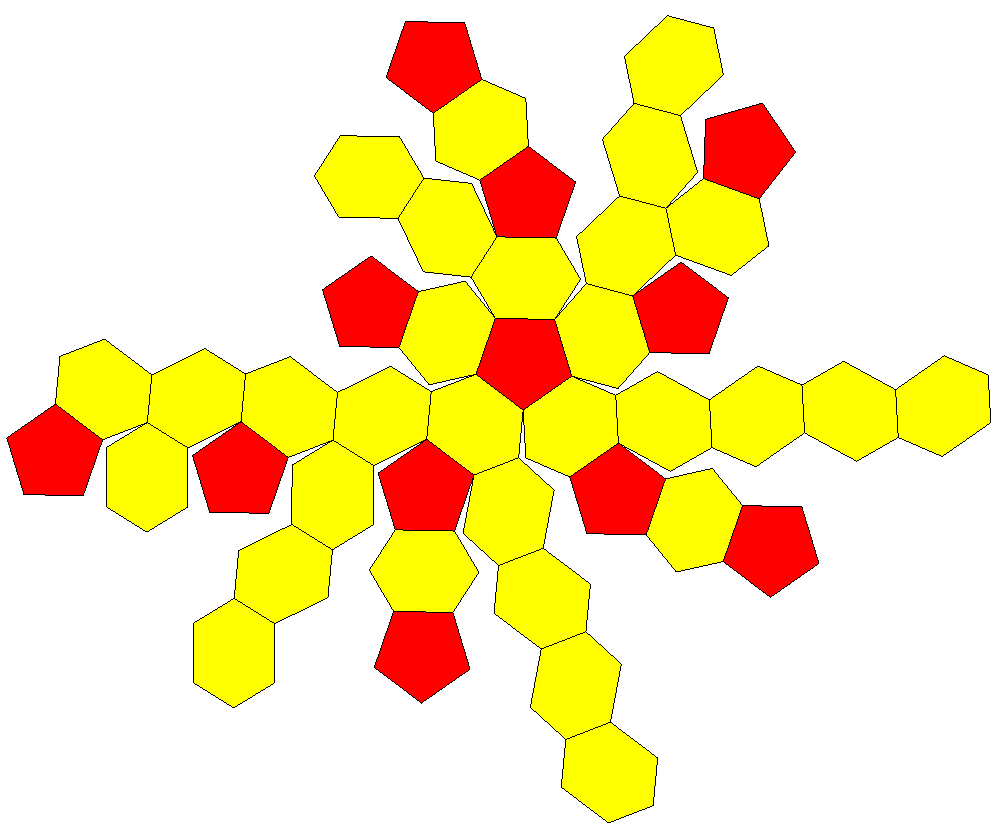

In geometry, the chamfered dodecahedron is a convex polyhedron with 80 vertices, 120 edges, and 42 faces: 30 hexagons and 12 pentagons. It is constructed as a chamfer (edge-truncation) of a regular dodecahedron. The pentagons are reduced in size and new hexagonal faces are added in place of all the original edges. Its dual is the pentakis icosidodecahedron.

It is also called a truncated rhombic triacontahedron, constructed as a truncation of the rhombic triacontahedron. It can more accurately be called an order-5 truncated rhombic triacontahedron because only the order-5 vertices are truncated.

3D model of a chamfered dodecahedron

Transformation of a regular dodecahedron into a chamfered dodecahedron, with equilateral (but not equiangular) hexagons

== Structure ==
These 12 order-5 vertices can be truncated such that all edges are of equal length. The original 30 rhombic faces become non-regular hexagons, and the truncated vertices become regular pentagons.

The hexagon faces can be equilateral but not regular with D_{2} symmetry. The angles at the two vertices with vertex configuration 6.6.6 are $\arccos\left(\frac{-1}{\sqrt{5}}\right) \approx 116.565^{\circ}$ and at the remaining four vertices with 5.6.6, they are ≈121.717° each.

It is the Goldberg polyhedron G_{V}(2,0), containing pentagonal and hexagonal faces.

It also represents the exterior envelope of a cell-centered orthogonal projection of the 120-cell, one of six convex regular 4-polytopes.

== Chemistry ==
The chamfered dodecahedron is the shape of the fullerene C_{80}. Occasionally, this shape is denoted C_{80}(I_{h}), describing its icosahedral symmetry and distinguishing it from other less-symmetric 80-vertex fullerenes. It is one of only four fullerenes found by Deza, Deza & Grishukhin (1998) to have a skeleton that can be isometrically embeddable into an L_{1} space.

== Related polyhedra ==
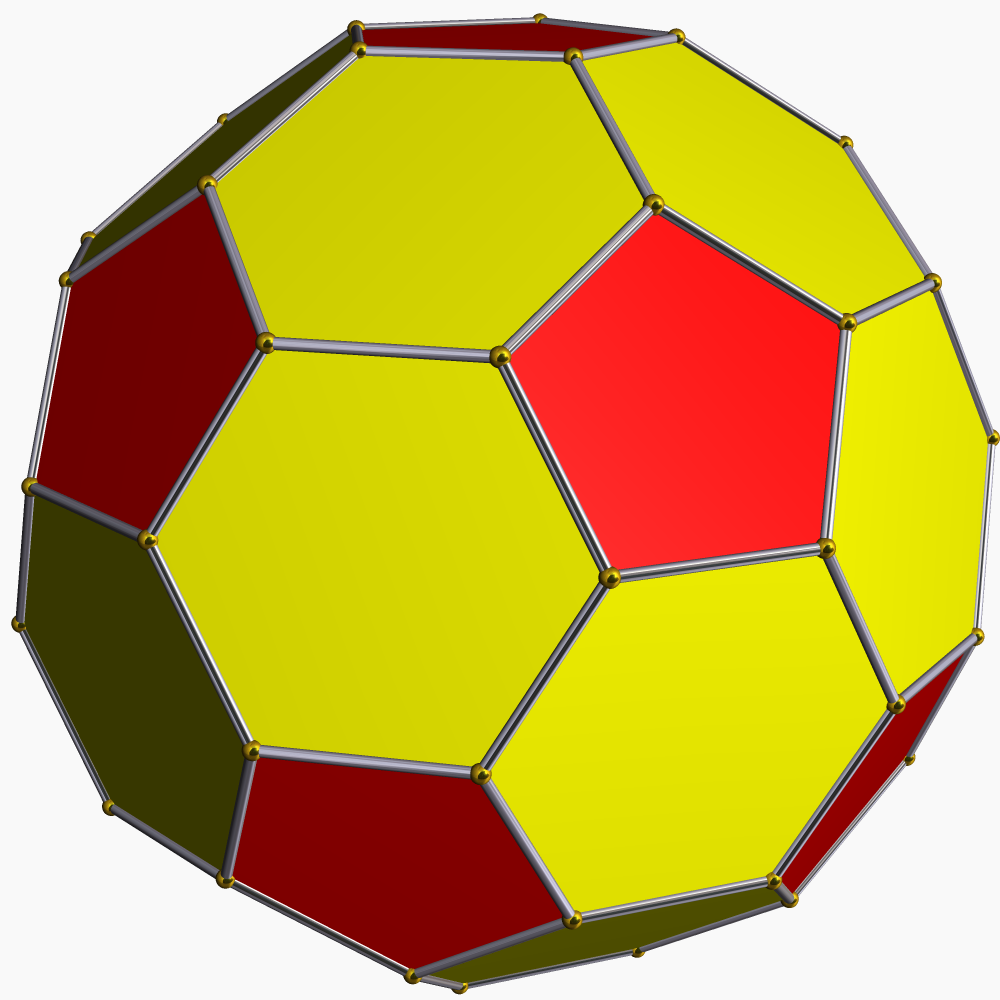
Truncated icosahedron, G(1,1)

Chamfered dodecahedron, G(2,0)

Truncated icosahedra have one hexagon (yellow) between three adjacent pentagons (red) whereas chamfered dodecahedra have three

The truncated icosahedron, which has 32 faces (12 pentagons and 20 hexagons) looks similar to the uniform chamfered dodecahedron (truncated rhombic triacontahedron), which has 42 faces (12 pentagons and 30 hexagons).

== Related polytopes ==
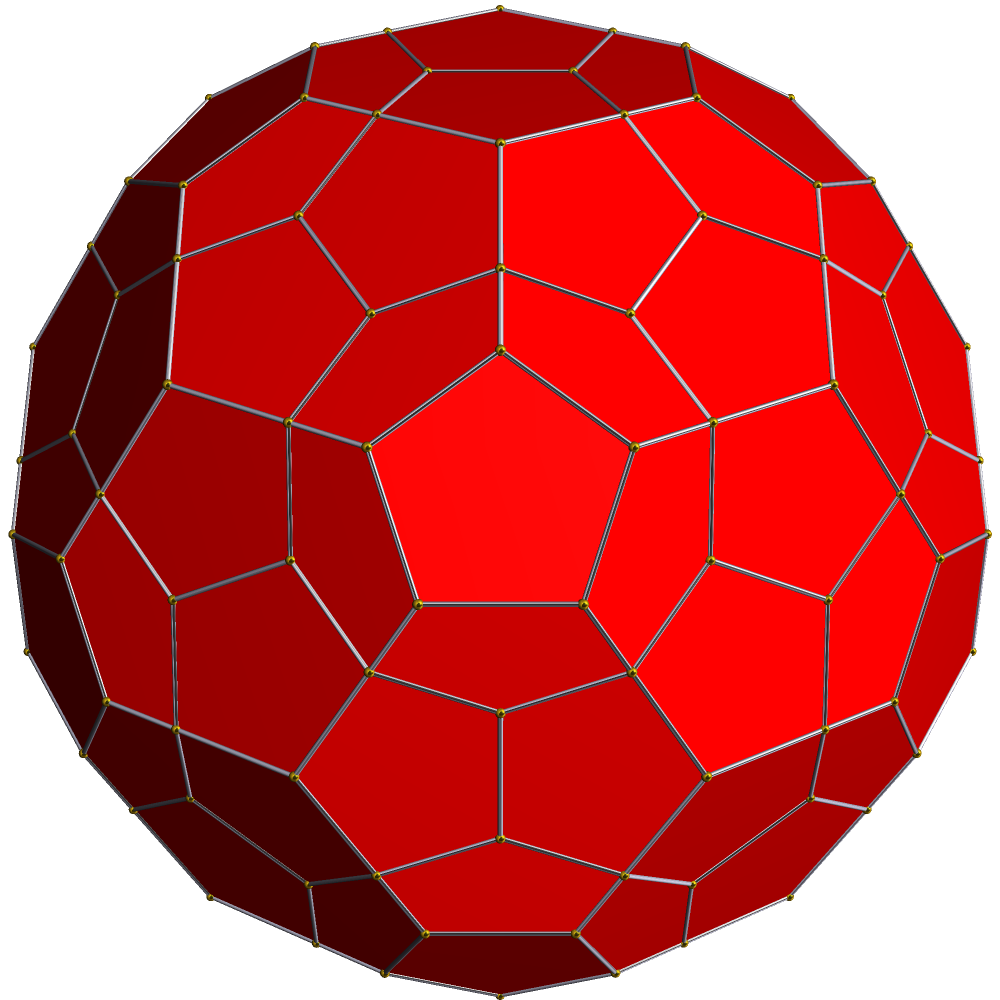
Cell-centered orthogonal projection of the 120-cell

It represents the exterior envelope of a cell-centered orthogonal projection of the 120-cell, one of six convex regular 4-polytopes, into 3 dimensions.
