= Goldberg polyhedron =

Convex polyhedron made from hexagons and pentagons

Icosahedral Goldberg polyhedra, with pentagons in red
GP(1,4) = {5+,3}_{1,4}	GP(4,4) = {5+,3}_{4,4}
GP(7,0) = {5+,3}_{7,0}	GP(3,5) = {5+,3}_{3,5}
GP(10,0) = {5+,3}_{10,0}, equilateral and spherical

In mathematics, and more specifically in polyhedral combinatorics, a Goldberg polyhedron is a convex polyhedron made from hexagons and pentagons. They were first described in 1937 by Michael Goldberg (1902–1990). They are defined by three properties: each face is either a pentagon or hexagon, exactly three faces meet at each vertex, and they have rotational icosahedral symmetry. They are not necessarily mirror-symmetric; e.g. GP(5,3) and GP(3,5) are enantiomorphs of each other. A Goldberg polyhedron is a dual polyhedron of a geodesic polyhedron.

A consequence of Euler's polyhedron formula is that a Goldberg polyhedron always has exactly 12 pentagonal faces. Icosahedral symmetry ensures that the pentagons are always regular. If the vertices are not constrained to a sphere, the polyhedron can be constructed with planar equilateral (but not in general equiangular) faces.

Simple examples of Goldberg polyhedra include the dodecahedron and truncated icosahedron. Other forms can be described by taking a chess knight move from one pentagon to the next: first take m steps in one direction, then turn 60° to the left and take n steps. Such a polyhedron is denoted GP(m,n). A dodecahedron is GP(1,0), and a truncated icosahedron is GP(1,1).

A later generalization also considers polyhedra with tetrahedral symmetry made from hexagons and 4 exceptional equilateral triangles and polyhedra with octahedral symmetry made from hexagons and 6 exceptional squares, in addition to the polyhedra with icosahedral symmetry made from hexagons and 12 exceptional pentagons. These variations are sometimes given Roman numeral subscripts denoting the number of sides on the non-hexagon faces: GP_{III}(n,m) (triangles), GP_{IV}(n,m) (squares), and GP_{V}(n,m) (pentagons).

== Elements ==
The number of vertices, edges, and faces of GP(m,n) can be computed from m and n, with
$$T = m^2 + mn + n^2 = (m + n)^2 - mn,$$
depending on one of three symmetry systems: The number of non-hexagonal faces can be determined using the Euler characteristic, as demonstrated here.

Symmetry	Icosahedral	Octahedral	Tetrahedral
Base	Dodecahedron; GP_{V}(1,0) = {5+,3}_{1,0}	Cube; GP_{IV}(1,0) = {4+,3}_{1,0}	Tetrahedron; GP_{III}(1,0) = {3+,3}_{1,0}
Image	Dodecahedron	Cube	Tetrahedron
Symbol	GP_{V}(m,n) = {5+,3}_{m,n}	GP_{IV}(m,n) = {4+,3}_{m,n}	GP_{III}(m,n) = {3+,3}_{m,n}
Vertices	20T	8T	4T
Edges	30T	12T	6T
Faces	10T + 2	4T + 2	2T + 2
Faces by type	12 {5} and 10(T − 1) {6}	6 {4} and 4(T − 1) {6}	4 {3} and 2(T − 1) {6}

== Construction ==
Most Goldberg polyhedra can be constructed using Conway polyhedron notation starting with (T)etrahedron, (C)ube, and (D)odecahedron seeds. The chamfer operator, c, replaces all edges by hexagons, transforming GP(m,n) to GP(2m,2n), with a T multiplier of 4. The truncated kis operator, y = tk, generates GP(3,0), transforming GP(m,n) to GP(3m,3n), with a T multiplier of 9.

For class 2 forms, the dual kis operator, z = dk, transforms GP(a,0) into GP(a,a), with a T multiplier of 3. For class 3 forms, the whirl operator, w, generates GP(2,1), with a T multiplier of 7. A clockwise and counterclockwise whirl generator, ww̅ = wrw generates GP(7,0) in class 1. In general, a whirl can transform a GP(a,b) into GP(a + 3b, 2ab) for a > b and the same chiral direction. If chiral directions are reversed, GP(a, b) becomes GP(2a + 3b, a − 2b) if a ≥ 2b, and GP(3a + b, 2b − a) if a < 2b.

== Class I ==
Class I Goldberg polyhedra are those GP(m,n) for which n = 0.

Class I polyhedra
Frequency	(1,0)	(2,0)	(3,0)	(4,0)	(5,0)	(6,0)	(m,0)
T	1	4	9	16	25	36	m^{2}
Icosahedral	regular dodecahedron	chamfered dodecahedron					more
Octahedral	cube	chamfered cube					more
Tetrahedral	tetrahedron	chamfered tetrahedron					more

== Class II ==
Class II Goldberg polyhedra are those GP(m,n) for which m = n.

Class II polyhedra
Frequency	(1,1)	(2,2)	(3,3)	(4,4)	(5,5)	(6,6)	(m,m)
T	3	12	27	48	75	108	3m^{2}
Icosahedral	truncated icosahedron						more
Octahedral	truncated octahedron						more
Tetrahedral	truncated tetrahedron						more

== Class III ==
Class III Goldberg polyhedra are those GP(m,n) for which m ≠ n and neither is zero.

Class III polyhedra
Frequency	(1,2)	(1,3)	(2,3)	(1,4)	(2,4)	(3,4)	(5,1)	(m,n)
T	7	13	19	21	28	37	31	m^{2} + mn + n^{2}
Icosahedral (Goldberg)								more
Octahedral								more
Tetrahedral								more

== See also ==
- Capsid
- Geodesic sphere
- Fullerene#Other buckyballs
- Conway polyhedron notation
- Goldberg–Coxeter construction
