= Geodesic polyhedron =

Polyhedron made from triangles that approximates a sphere

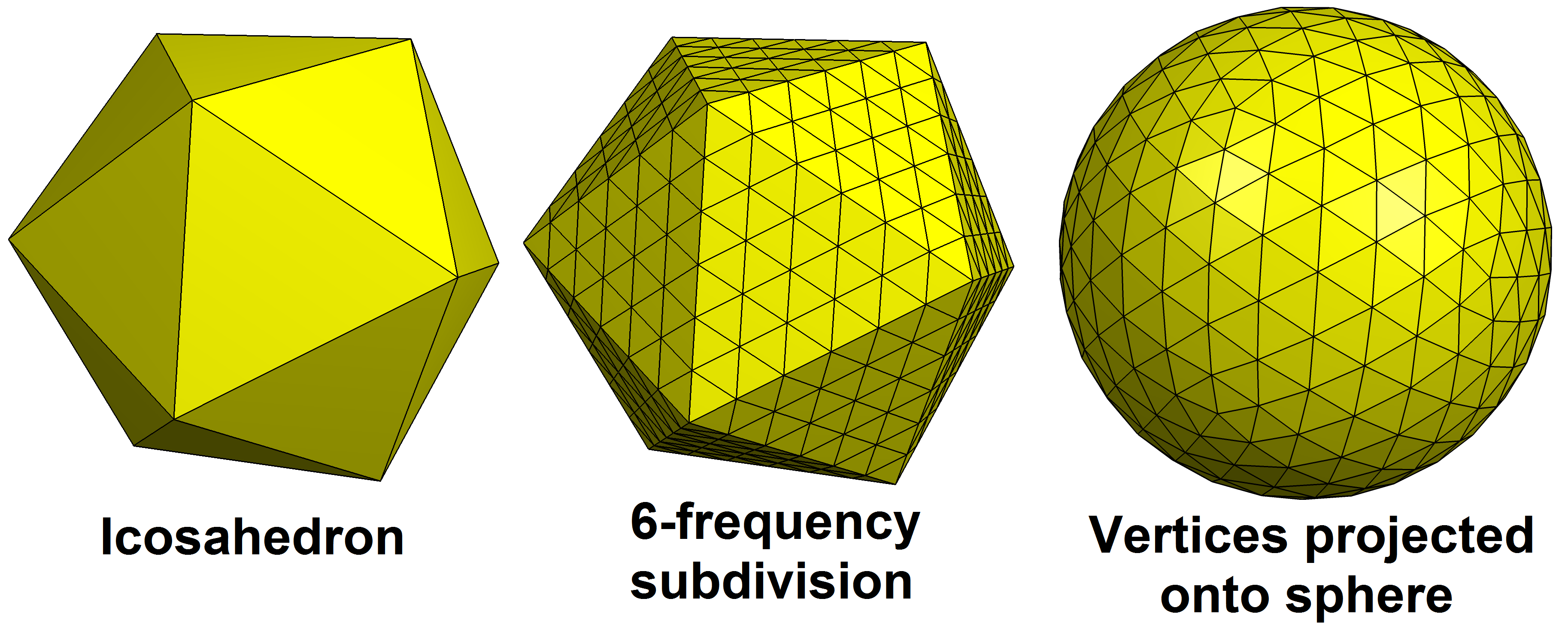
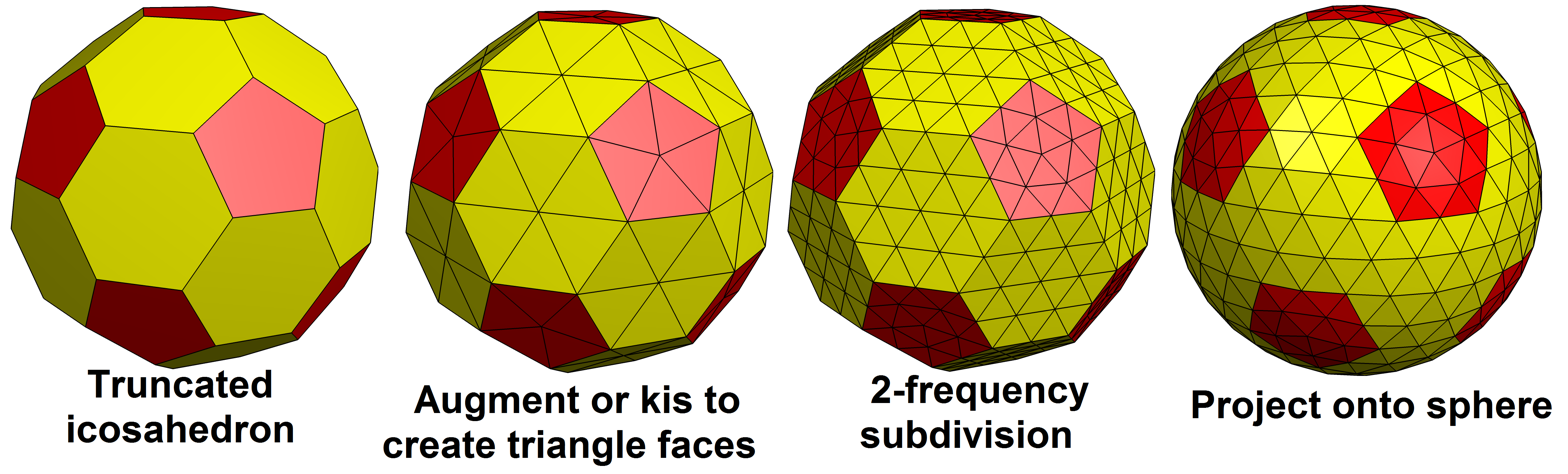
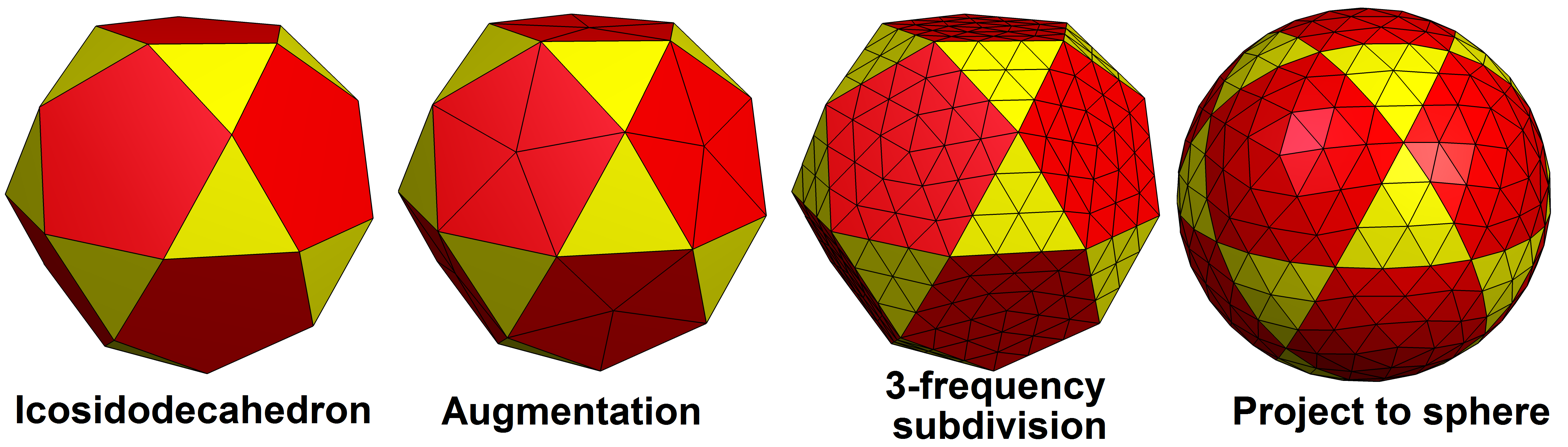
An icosahedron and polyhedra with related symmetry can be used to define a high geodesic polyhedron by dividing triangular faces into smaller triangles and projecting all vertices onto a sphere. Higher order polygonal faces can be divided into triangles by adding new vertices centered on each face. The new faces on the sphere are not equilateral triangles, but they are approximately equal edge length. All vertices are valence-6 except 12 vertices which are valence 5.

A geodesic polyhedron is a convex polyhedron made from triangles which approximates a sphere. They usually have icosahedral symmetry, such that they have 6 triangles at a vertex, except 12 vertices which have 5 triangles. They are the dual of corresponding Goldberg polyhedra, of which all but the smallest one (which is a regular dodecahedron) have mostly hexagonal faces. The Goldberg–Coxeter construction is an expansion of the concepts underlying geodesic polyhedra.

Geodesic polyhedra are a good approximation to a sphere for many purposes, and appear in many different contexts. The most well-known may be the geodesic domes, hemispherical architectural structures designed by Buckminster Fuller, which geodesic polyhedra are named after. Geodesic grids used in geodesy also have the geometry of geodesic polyhedra. The capsids of some viruses have the shape of geodesic polyhedra, and some pollen grains are based on geodesic polyhedra. Fullerene molecules have the shape of Goldberg polyhedra. Geodesic polyhedra are available as geometric primitives in the Blender 3D modeling software package, which calls them icospheres: they are an alternative to the UV sphere, having a more regular distribution.

== Construction ==
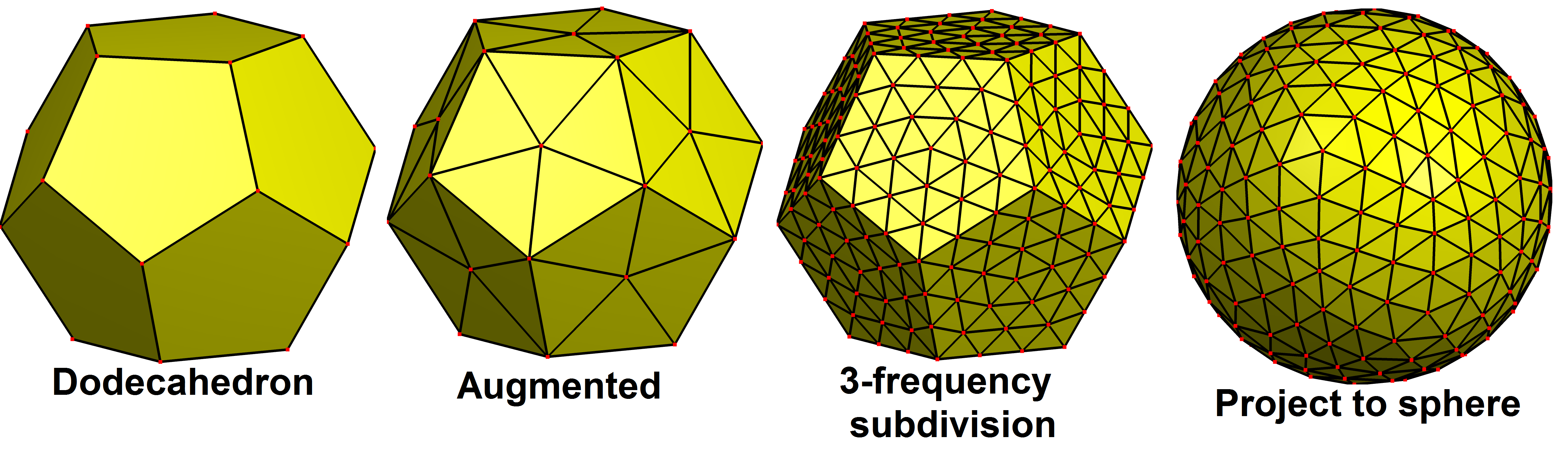
Geodesic subdivisions can be done from an augmented dodecahedron, dividing pentagons into triangles with a center point, and subdividing from that.

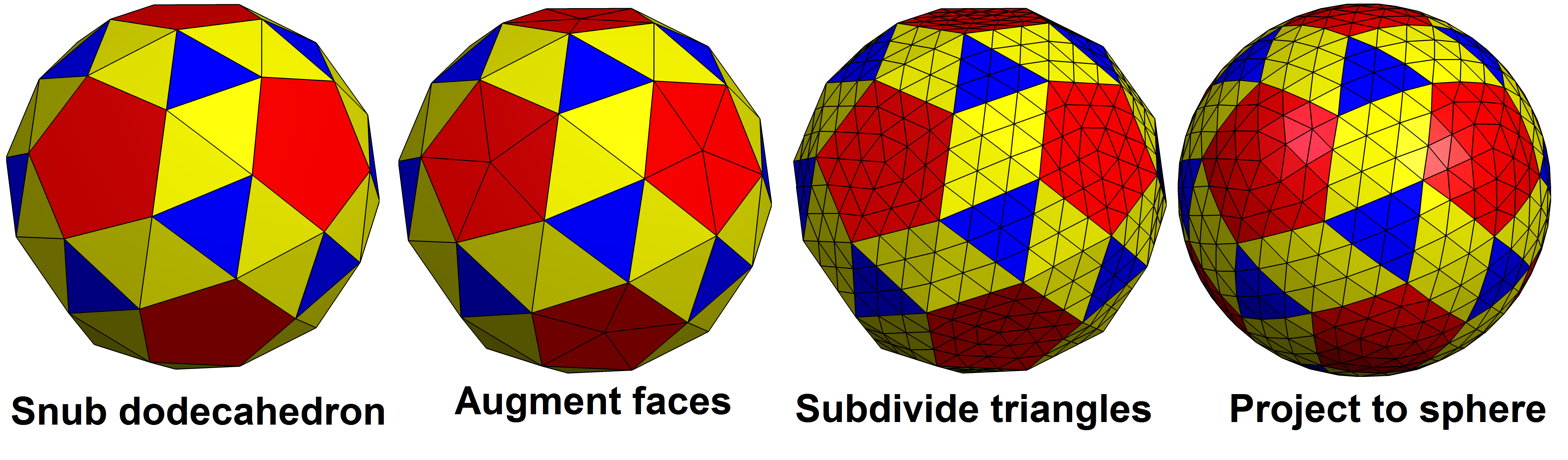
Chiral polyhedra with higher order polygonal faces can be augmented by adding vertices centered on each face to divide them into triangles. Those triangles can then be subdivided into smaller triangles for new geodesic polyhedra. All vertices are valence-6 except the 12 centered at the original vertices which are valence 5.

Geodesic polyhedra are constructed by subdividing faces of simpler polyhedra, and then projecting the new vertices onto the surface of a sphere. A geodesic polyhedron has straight edges and flat faces that approximate a spherical polyhedron constructed from geodesic triangles.

== Notation ==
In Magnus Wenninger's Spherical Models, polyhedra are given geodesic notation in the form {3,q+}_{b,c}, where {3,q} is the Schläfli symbol for the regular polyhedron with triangular faces, and q-valence vertices. The + symbol indicates the valence of the vertices being increased. b and c represent a subdivision description, with 1,0 representing the base form. There are 3 symmetry classes of forms: {3,3+}_{1,0} for a tetrahedron, {3,4+}_{1,0} for an octahedron, and {3,5+}_{1,0} for an icosahedron.

The dual notation for Goldberg polyhedra is {q+,3}_{b,c}, with valence-3 vertices, with q-gonal and hexagonal faces. There are 3 symmetry classes of forms: {3+,3}_{1,0} for a tetrahedron, {4+,3}_{1,0} for a cube, and {5+,3}_{1,0} for a dodecahedron.

Values for b and c are divided into three classes:

1. Class I (b = 0 or c = 0): {3,q+}_{b,0} or {3,q+}_{0,b} represent a simple division with original edges being divided into b sub-edges.
2. Class II (b = c): {3,q+}_{b,b} are easier to see from the dual polyhedron {q,3} with q-gonal faces first divided into triangles with a central point, and then all edges are divided into b sub-edges.
3. Class III: {3,q+}_{b,c} have nonzero unequal values for b and c, and exist in chiral pairs. For b > c we can define it as a right-handed form, and c > b is a left-handed form.

Subdivisions in class III here do not line up simply with the original edges. The subgrids can be extracted by looking at a triangular tiling, positioning a large triangle on top of grid vertices and walking paths from one vertex b steps in one direction, and a turn, either clockwise or counterclockwise, and then another c steps to the next primary vertex.

For example, the icosahedron is {3,5+}_{1,0}, and pentakis dodecahedron, {3,5+}_{1,1} is seen as a regular dodecahedron with pentagonal faces divided into 5 triangles.

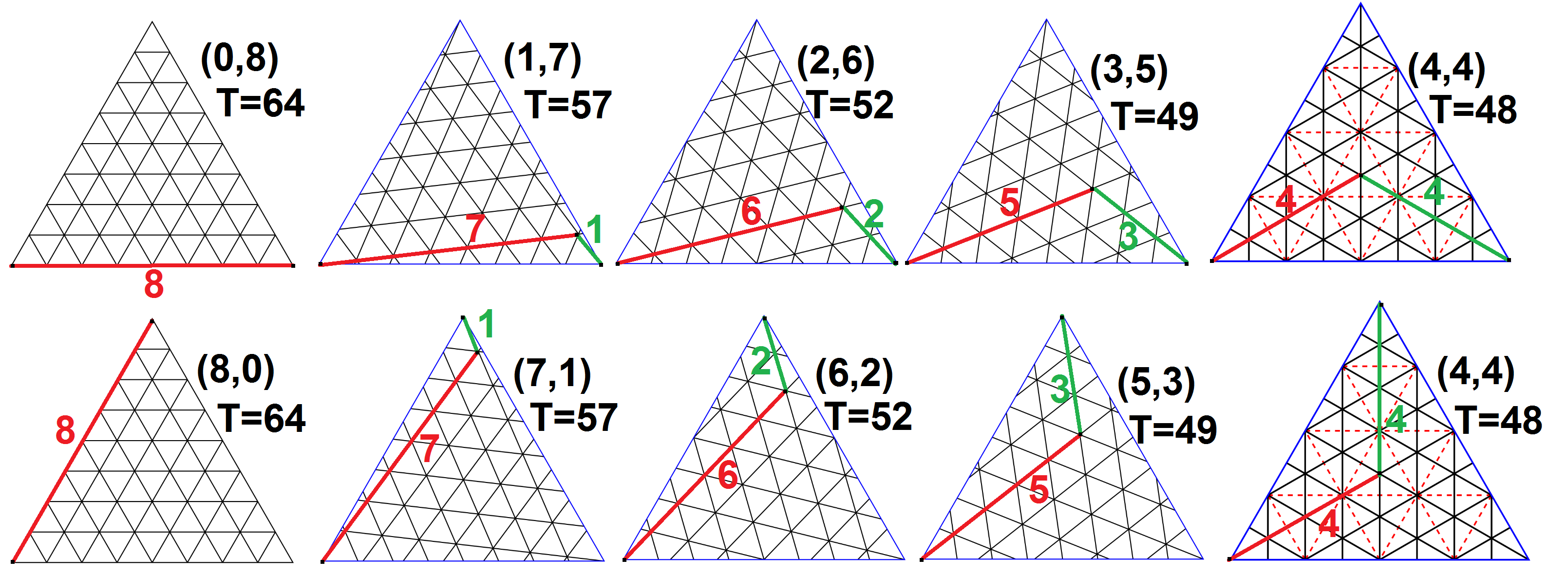
PPTs with frequency 8

The primary face of the subdivision is called a principal polyhedral triangle (PPT) or the breakdown structure. Calculating a single PPT allows the entire figure to be created.

The frequency of a geodesic polyhedron is defined by the sum of ν = b + c. A harmonic is a subfrequency and can be any whole divisor of ν. Class II always have a harmonic of 2, since ν = 2b.

The triangulation number is T = b^{2} + bc + c^{2}. This number times the number of original faces expresses how many triangles the new polyhedron will have.

Conway	u_{3}I = (kt)I	(k)tI	ktI
Image			
Form	3-frequency subdivided icosahedron	Kis truncated icosahedron	Geodesic polyhedron (3,0)

In this case, {3,5+}_{3,0}, with frequency ν = 3 and triangulation number T = 9, each of the versions of the polygon has 92 vertices (80 where six edges join, and 12 where five join), 270 edges and 180 faces.

== Elements ==
The number of elements are specified by the triangulation number T = b^{2} + bc + c^{2}. Two different geodesic polyhedra may have the same number of elements, for instance, {3,5+}_{5,3} and {3,5+}_{7,0} both have T = 49.

Symmetry	Icosahedral	Octahedral	Tetrahedral
Base	Icosahedron {3,5} = {3,5+}_{1,0}	Octahedron {3,4} = {3,4+}_{1,0}	Tetrahedron {3,3} = {3,3+}_{1,0}
Image	Icosahedron	Octahedron	Tetrahedron
Symbol	{3,5+}_{b,c}	{3,4+}_{b,c}	{3,3+}_{b,c}
Vertices	10T + 2	4T + 2	2T + 2
Faces	20T	8T	4T
Edges	$30T$	$12T$	$6T$

== Relation to Goldberg polyhedra ==
Geodesic polyhedra are the duals of Goldberg polyhedra. Goldberg polyhedra are also related in that applying a kis operator (dividing faces into triangles with a center point) creates new geodesic polyhedra, and truncating vertices of a geodesic polyhedron creates a new Goldberg polyhedron. For example, Goldberg G(2,1) kised, becomes {3,5+}_{4,1}, and truncating that becomes G(6,3). And similarly {3,5+}_{2,1} truncated becomes G(4,1), and that kised becomes {3,5+}_{6,3}.

== Examples ==
=== Class I ===
Class I geodesic polyhedra
Frequency	(1,0)	(2,0)	(3,0)	(4,0)	(5,0)	(6,0)	(7,0)	(8,0)	(m,0)
T	1	4	9	16	25	36	49	64	m^{2}
Face triangle									...
Icosahedral									more
Octahedral									more
Tetrahedral									more

=== Class II ===
Class II geodesic polyhedra
Frequency	(1,1)	(2,2)	(3,3)	(4,4)	(5,5)	(6,6)	(7,7)	(8,8)	(m,m)
T	3	12	27	48	75	108	147	192	3m^{2}
Face triangle									...
Icosahedral									more
Octahedral									more
Tetrahedral									more

=== Class III ===
Class III geodesic polyhedra
Frequency	(2,1)	(3,1)	(3,2)	(4,1)	(4,2)	(4,3)	(5,1)	(5,2)	(m,n)
T	7	13	19	21	28	37	31	39	m^{2} + mn + n^{2}
Face triangle									...
Icosahedral									more
Octahedral									more
Tetrahedral									more

== Spherical models ==
Magnus Wenninger's book Spherical Models explores these subdivisions in building polyhedron models. After explaining the construction of these models, he explained his usage of triangular grids to mark out patterns, with triangles colored or excluded in the models.

Example model
An artistic model created by Father Magnus Wenninger called Order in Chaos, representing a chiral subset of triangles of a 16-frequency icosahedral geodesic sphere, {3,5+}_{16,0}	A virtual copy showing icosahedral symmetry great circles. The 6-fold rotational symmetry is illusionary, not existing on the icosahedron itself.	A single icosahedral triangle with a 16-frequency subdivision

== See also ==
- Conway polyhedron notation – Method of describing higher-order polyhedra

== Bibliography ==
- Williams, Robert (1979). The Geometrical Foundation of Natural Structure: A source book of Design. pp. 142–144, Figure 4-49, 50, 51 Custers of 12 spheres, 42 spheres, 92 spheres.
- Pugh, Antony (1976). "Chapter 6. The Geodesic Polyhedra of R. Buckminster Fuller and Related Polyhedra". Polyhedra: a visual approach.
- Wenninger, Magnus (1979). Spherical Models. Cambridge University Press. ISBN 978-0-521-29432-4. MR 0552023. Archived from the original on July 4, 2008. Reprinted by Dover (1999), ISBN 978-0-486-40921-4.
- Popko, Edward S. (2012). "Chapter 8. Subdivision schemas, 8.1 Geodesic Notation, 8.2 Triangulation number 8.3 Frequency and Harmonics 8.4 Grid Symmetry 8.5 Class I: Alternates and fords 8.5.1 Defining the Principal triangle 8.5.2 Edge Reference Points". Divided spheres: Geodesics & the Orderly Subdivision of the Sphere.
