= Triaugmented triangular prism =

Convex polyhedron with 14 triangle faces

- Type: Deltahedron, Johnson; J_{50} – J_{51} – J_{52}
- Faces: 14 triangles
- Edges: 21
- Vertices: 9
- Vertex configuration: $3\times 3^4+6\times 3^5$
- Symmetry group: $D_{3\mathrm{h}}$
- Dihedral angle (degrees): 109.5° 144.7° 169.5°
- Dual polyhedron: Associahedron K_{5}
- Properties: convex, composite

Net

The triaugmented triangular prism, in geometry, is a convex polyhedron with 14 equilateral triangles as its faces. It can be constructed from a triangular prism by attaching equilateral square pyramids to each of its three square faces. The same shape is also called the tetrakis triangular prism, tricapped trigonal prism, tetracaidecadeltahedron, or tetrakaidecadeltahedron; these last names mean a polyhedron with 14 triangular faces. It is a deltahedron, a composite polyhedron, and a Johnson solid.

The edges and vertices of the triaugmented triangular prism form a maximal planar graph with 9 vertices and 21 edges, called the Fritsch graph. It was used by Rudolf and Gerda Fritsch to show that Alfred Kempe's attempted proof of the four color theorem was incorrect. The Fritsch graph is one of only six graphs in which every neighborhood is a 4- or 5-vertex cycle.

The dual polyhedron of the triaugmented triangular prism is an associahedron, a polyhedron with four quadrilateral faces and six pentagons whose vertices represent the 14 triangulations of a regular hexagon. In the same way, the nine vertices of the triaugmented triangular prism represent the nine diagonals of a hexagon, with two vertices connected by an edge when the corresponding two diagonals do not cross. Other applications of the triaugmented triangular prism appear in chemistry as the basis for the tricapped trigonal prismatic molecular geometry, and in mathematical optimization as a solution to the Thomson problem and Tammes problem.

== Construction ==
=== Augmentation ===
The triaugmented triangular prism can be constructed by attaching equilateral square pyramids to each of the three square faces of a triangular prism, a process called augmentation. An equilateral square pyramid is a pyramid with a square base and four equilateral triangular faces. A triangular prism is a prism with two triangular bases and three quadrilateral faces, and in this context, the triangular prism is uniform with equilateral triangular bases and square faces. The pyramids cover each square, replacing it with four equilateral triangles, so that the resulting polyhedron has 14 equilateral triangles as its faces. It has 9 vertices and 21 edges. Three of the vertices are surrounded by four equilateral triangles and six by five equilateral triangles. Hence, the vertex configuration of a triaugmented triangular prism (a notation, describing a polyhedron by the number of faces surrounding each vertex) is $3 \times (3^4) + 6 \times (3^5)$.

Since its faces are 14 equilateral triangles, a triaugmented triangular prism is a deltahedron, a polyhedron with equilateral triangular faces. There are infinitely many deltahedra, but only eight that are convex polyhedra, including the triaugmented triangular prism. More generally, convex polyhedra in which all faces are regular polygons (excluding the uniform polyhedra) are called Johnson solids. The triaugmented triangular prism is Johnson solid number $J_{51}$.

3D model of a triaugmented triangular prism

The triaugmented triangular prism is a composite polyhedron: it can be sliced by a plane so that the resulting pieces are convex, regular-faced polyhedra. Repeating this process until until no more slices are possible results in elementary polyhedra. When the triaugmented triangular prism is sliced once, a square pyramid is separated from a biaugmented triangular prism; a second slice separates another square pyramid from an augmented triangular prism; a third and final slice separates a third square pyramid from a triangular prism. The augmented and biaugmented triangular prism are both Johnson solids and composite polyhedra. The square pyramids and the triangular prism are elementary polyhedra and cannot be further sliced.

=== Cartesian coordinates ===
One possible system of Cartesian coordinates for the vertices of a triaugmented triangular prism, giving it edge length 2, is:
$$\begin{align}
\left(0,\frac2{\sqrt3},\pm1 \right),\qquad & \left(\pm1,-\frac1{\sqrt3},\pm1 \right),\\
\left(0,-\frac{1+\sqrt6}{\sqrt3},0 \right),\qquad & \left(\pm\frac{1+\sqrt6}{2},\frac{1+\sqrt6}{2\sqrt3},0\right).\\
\end{align}$$

== Properties ==
=== Measurement ===
A triaugmented triangular prism with edge length $a$ has surface area
$$A = \frac{7\sqrt{3}}{2}a^2\approx 6.062a^2,$$
the area of 14 equilateral triangles. Its volume,
$$V = \frac{2\sqrt{2}+\sqrt{3}}{4}a^3\approx 1.140a^3,$$
can be derived by slicing it into a central prism and three square pyramids, and adding their volumes.

Two unfolded nets of the triaugmented triangular prism, showing its two types of closed geodesics. Prism faces are pink; pyramid faces are blue and yellow.

The triaugmented triangular prism has two types of closed geodesics. These are paths on its surface that are locally straight: they avoid vertices of the polyhedron, follow line segments across the faces that they cross, and form complementary angles on the two incident faces of each edge that they cross. One of the two types of closed geodesic runs parallel to the square base of a pyramid, through the eight faces surrounding the pyramid. For a polyhedron with unit-length sides, this geodesic has length $4$. The other type of closed geodesic crosses ten faces, and has length $\sqrt{19}\approx 4.36$. For each type there is a continuous family of parallel geodesics, all of the same length.

The triaugmented triangular prism has three different dihedral angles (angles that are formed by two adjacent triangular faces), which can be calculated by adding the angles of the component pyramids and prism. The prism itself has square-triangle dihedral angles $\pi/2$ and square-square angles $\pi/3$. The triangle-triangle angles on the pyramid are the same as in the regular octahedron, and the square-triangle angles are half that. Therefore, for the triaugmented triangular prism, the dihedral angles incident to the degree-four vertices, on the edges of the prism triangles, and on the square-to-square prism edges are, respectively,
$$\begin{align}
\arccos\left(-\frac13\right)&\approx 109.5^\circ,\\
\frac{\pi}{2}+\frac12\arccos\left(-\frac13\right)&\approx 144.7^\circ,\\
\frac{\pi}{3}+\arccos\left(-\frac13\right)&\approx 169.5^\circ.\\
\end{align}$$

=== Symmetry ===
The triaugmented triangular prism has the same three-dimensional symmetry group as the triangular prism, prismatic symmetry $D_{3\mathrm{h}}$ of order twelve. Its symmetries include a three-fold axis of symmetry (0°, 120°, and 240°) passing through the two base triangles of the central prism; three two-fold axes (0° and 180°), each passing perpendicularly through one square face of the central prism and perpendicular to the three-fold axis of symmetry; one reflection plane passing perpendicularly through each square face of the central prism; and three vertical reflection planes through one square face of the central prism and its opposite edge.

== Fritsch graph ==
The Fritsch graph and its dual map. For the partial 4-coloring shown, the red–green and blue–green Kempe chains cross. It is not possible to free a color for the uncolored center region by swapping colors in a single chain, contradicting Alfred Kempe's false proof of the four color theorem.

The graph of the triaugmented triangular prism has 9 vertices and 21 edges. It was used by Fritsch & Fritsch (1998) as a small counterexample to Alfred Kempe's false proof of the four color theorem using Kempe chains, and its dual map was used as their book's cover illustration. This graph has subsequently been named the Fritsch graph. An even smaller counterexample, the Soifer graph, is obtained by removing one edge from the Fritsch graph (the bottom edge in the illustration here).

The Fritsch graph is one of only six connected graphs in which the neighborhood of every vertex is a cycle of length four or five. More generally, when every vertex in a graph has a cycle of length at least four as its neighborhood, the triangles of the graph automatically link up to form a topological surface called a Whitney triangulation. These six graphs come from the six Whitney triangulations that, when their triangles are equilateral, have positive angular defect at every vertex. This makes them a combinatorial analogue of the positively curved smooth surfaces. They come from six of the eight deltahedra—excluding the two that have a vertex with a triangular neighborhood. As well as the Fritsch graph, the other five are the graphs of the regular octahedron, regular icosahedron, pentagonal bipyramid, snub disphenoid, and gyroelongated square bipyramid.

== Applications ==
In the geometry of chemical compounds, it is common to visualize an atom cluster surrounding a central atom as a polyhedron, the convex hull of the surrounding atoms' locations. The tricapped trigonal prismatic molecular geometry describes clusters for which this polyhedron is a triaugmented triangular prism, although not necessarily one with equilateral triangle faces. For example, the lanthanides from lanthanum to dysprosium dissolve in water to form cations surrounded by nine water molecules arranged as a triaugmented triangular prism.

In the Thomson problem, concerning the minimum-energy configuration of $n$ charged particles on a sphere, and for the Tammes problem of constructing a spherical code maximizing the smallest distance among the points, the minimum solution known for $n=9$ places the points at the vertices of a triaugmented triangular prism with non-equilateral faces, inscribed in a sphere. This configuration is optimal for the Tammes problem, but a rigorous solution to this instance of the Thomson problem is not known.

== Dual associahedron ==
Dual polyhedron of the triaugmented triangular prism

The dual polyhedron of the triaugmented triangular prism has a face for each vertex of the triaugmented triangular prism, and a vertex for each face. It is an enneahedron (that is, a nine-sided polyhedron) that can be realized with three non-adjacent square faces, and six more faces that are congruent irregular pentagons. It is also known as an order-5 associahedron, a polyhedron whose vertices represent the 14 triangulations of a regular hexagon. A less-symmetric form of this dual polyhedron, obtained by slicing a truncated octahedron into four congruent quarters by two planes that perpendicularly bisect two parallel families of its edges, is a space-filling polyhedron.

More generally, when a polytope is the dual of an associahedron, its boundary (a simplicial complex of triangles, tetrahedra, or higher-dimensional simplices) is called a "cluster complex". In the case of the triaugmented triangular prism, it is a cluster complex of type $A_3$, associated with the $A_3$ Dynkin diagram, the $A_3$ root system, and the $A_3$ cluster algebra. The connection with the associahedron provides a correspondence between the nine vertices of the triaugmented triangular prism and the nine diagonals of a hexagon. The edges of the triaugmented triangular prism correspond to pairs of diagonals that do not cross, and the triangular faces of the triaugmented triangular prism correspond to the triangulations of the hexagon (consisting of three non-crossing diagonals). The triangulations of other regular polygons correspond to polytopes in the same way, with dimension equal to the number of sides of the polygon minus three.
