= Poppy-seed bagel theorem =

Physics theorem of interacting particles

In physics, the poppy-seed bagel theorem concerns interacting particles (e.g., electrons) confined to a bounded surface (or body) $A$ when the particles repel each other pairwise with a magnitude that is proportional to the inverse distance between them raised to some positive power $s$. In particular, this includes the Coulomb law observed in electrostatics and Riesz potentials extensively studied in potential theory. Other classes of potentials, which not necessarily involve the Riesz kernel, for example nearest neighbor interactions, are also described by this theorem in the macroscopic regime. For $N$ such particles, a stable equilibrium state, which depends on the parameter $s$, is attained when the associated potential energy of the system is minimal (the so-called generalized Thomson problem). For large numbers of points, these equilibrium configurations provide a discretization of $A$ which may or may not be nearly uniform with respect to the surface area (or volume) of $A$. The poppy-seed bagel theorem asserts that for a large class of sets $A$, the uniformity property holds when the parameter $s$ is larger than or equal to the dimension of the set $A$. For example, when the points ("poppy seeds") are confined to the 2-dimensional surface of a torus embedded in 3 dimensions (or "surface of a bagel"), one can create a large number of points that are nearly uniformly spread on the surface by imposing a repulsion proportional to the inverse square distance between the points, or any stronger repulsion ($s\geq2$). From a culinary perspective, to create the nearly perfect poppy-seed bagel where bites of equal size anywhere on the bagel would contain essentially the same number of poppy seeds, impose at least an inverse square distance repelling force on the seeds.

== Formal definitions ==
For a parameter $s>0$ and an $N$-point set $\omega_{N}=\{x_1, \ldots, x_N\}\subset \mathbb{R}^p$, the $s$-energy of $\omega_N$ is defined as follows:
$$E_s(\omega_N):=\sum_{\stackrel{1 \leq i,j \leq N}{i \not= j}} \frac{1}{|x_i - x_j|^s}$$
For a compact set $A$ we define its minimal $N$-point $s$-energy as
$$\mathcal{E}_s(A, N):=\min E_s(\omega_N),$$
where the minimum is taken over all $N$-point subsets of $A$; i.e., $\omega_N\subset A$. Configurations $\omega_N$ that attain this infimum are called $N$-point $s$-equilibrium configurations.

== Poppy-seed bagel theorem for bodies ==
We consider compact sets $A\subset \mathbb{R}^p$ with the Lebesgue measure $\lambda(A)>0$ and $s\geqslant p$. For every $N\geqslant 2$ fix an $N$-point $s$-equilibrium configuration $\omega_N^*=\{x_{1, N}, \ldots, x_{N, N}\}$. Set
$$\mu_N:=\frac{1}{N}\sum_{i=1,\ldots,N} \delta_{x_{i, N}},$$
where $\delta_x$ is a unit point mass at point $x$. Under these assumptions, in the sense of weak convergence of measures,
$$\mu_N \stackrel{*}{\rightarrow} \mu,$$
where $\mu$ is the Lebesgue measure restricted to $A$; i.e., $\mu(B)=\lambda(A \cap B)/\lambda(A)$. Furthermore, it is true that
$$\lim_{N\to \infty} \frac{\mathcal{E}_s(A, N)}{N^{1+s/p}} = \frac{C_{s, p}}{\lambda(A)^{s/p}},$$
where the constant $C_{s,p}$ does not depend on the set $A$ and, therefore,
$$C_{s,p}=\lim_{N\to \infty} \frac{\mathcal{E}_s([0,1]^p, N)}{N^{1+s/p}},$$
where $[0,1]^p$ is the unit cube in $\mathbb{R}^p$.

== Poppy-seed bagel theorem for manifolds ==
Near minimal $s$-energy 1000-point configurations on a torus ($d=2$)

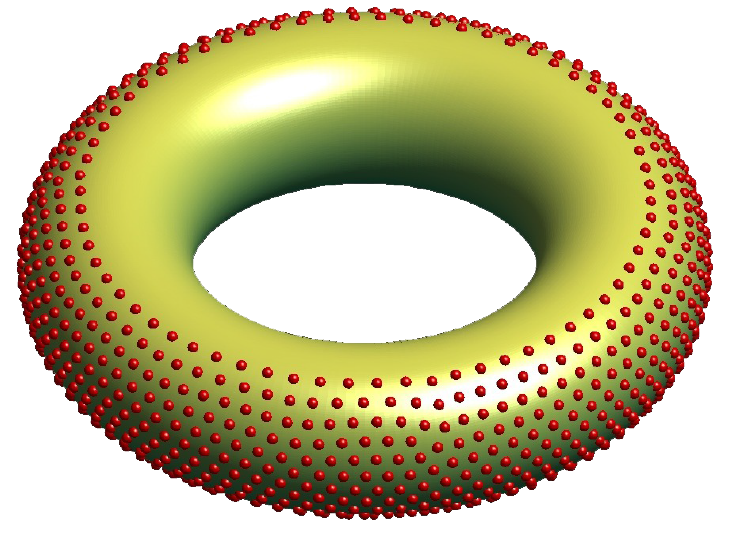
$s=0.01<d$

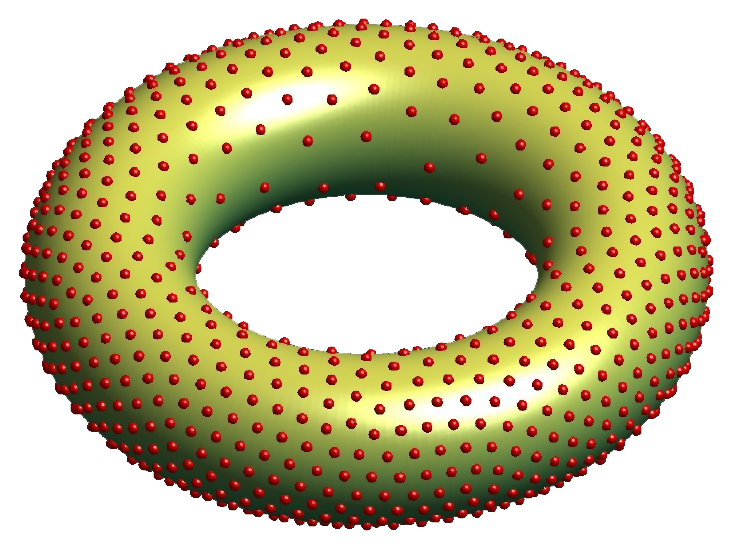
$s=1<d$

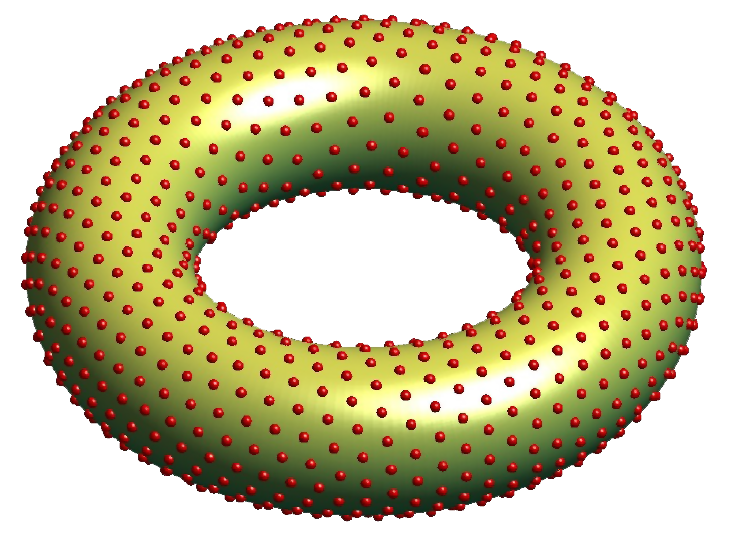
$s=2=d$

Consider a smooth $d$-dimensional manifold $A$ embedded in $\mathbb{R}^p$ and denote its surface measure by $\sigma$. We assume $\sigma(A)>0$. Assume $s\geqslant d$ As before, for every $N\geqslant 2$ fix an $N$-point $s$-equilibrium configuration $\omega_N^*=\{x_{1, N}, \ldots, x_{N, N}\}$ and set
$$\mu_N:=\frac{1}{N}\sum_{i=1,\ldots,N} \delta_{x_{i, N}}.$$
Then, in the sense of weak convergence of measures,
$$\mu_N \stackrel{*}{\rightarrow} \mu,$$
where $\mu(B)=\sigma(A \cap B)/\sigma(A)$. If $H^d$ is the $d$-dimensional Hausdorff measure normalized so that $H^d([0,1]^d)=1$, then
$$\lim_{N\to \infty} \frac{\mathcal{E}_s(A, N)}{N^{1+s/d}}=2^s \alpha_d^{-s/d} \cdot \frac{C_{s,d}}{(H^d(A))^{s/d}},$$
where $\alpha_d=\pi^{d/2}/\Gamma(1+d/2)$ is the volume of a d-ball.

== The constant C_{s,p} ==
For $p=1$, it is known that $C_{s,1}=2\zeta(s)$, where $\zeta(s)$ is the Riemann zeta function. Using a modular form approach to linear programming, Viazovska together with coauthors established in a 2022 paper that in dimensions $p=8$ and $p=24$, the values of $C_{s,p}$, $s>p$, are given by the Epstein zeta function associated with the $E_8$ lattice and Leech lattice, respectively. It is conjectured that for $p=2$, the value of $C_{s,p}$ is similarly determined as the value of the Epstein zeta function for the hexagonal lattice. Finally, in every dimension $p\geq 1$ it is known that when $s=p$, the scaling of $\mathcal{E}_s(A, N)$ becomes $N^2\log N$ rather than $N^2= N^{1+s/p}$, and the value of $C_{s,p}$ can be computed explicitly as the volume of the unit $p$-dimensional ball:
$$C_{s,p} = H^p(\mathcal B^p) = \frac{\pi^{p/2}}{\Gamma(1+p/2)}.$$
The following connection between the constant $C_{s,p}$ and the problem of sphere packing is known:
$$\lim_{s\to \infty} (C_{s,p})^{1/s} = \frac{1}{s} \left( \frac{\alpha_p}{\Delta_p}\right)^{1/p},$$
where $\alpha_p$ is the volume of a p-ball and
$$\Delta_p = \sup \rho(\mathcal{P}),$$
where the supremum is taken over all families $\mathcal{P}$ of non-overlapping unit balls such that the limit
$$\rho(\mathcal{P}) = \lim_{r\to \infty} \frac{\lambda\left([-r, r]^p \cap \bigcup_{B\in \mathcal{P}}B\right)}{(2r)^{p}}$$
exists.

== See also ==
- Hausdorff dimension
- Geometric measure theory
- Sphere packing
- Riemann zeta function
