= Spherical packing =

Spherical packing may refer to:

- Sphere packing
- Spherical code
