= Jantina Tammes =

Dutch botanist and geneticist

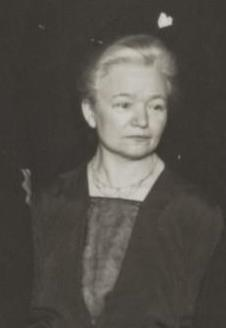
- Tine Tammes (1926)
- Born: 23 June 1871; Groningen, Netherlands
- Died: 20 September 1947 (aged 76); Groningen, Netherlands
- Education: University of Groningen
- Known for: Die Periodicität morphologischer Erscheinungen bei den Pflanzenkn (The frequency of morphological phenomena in plants)
- Relatives: Arnold Tammes (lawyer), Pieter Merkus Lambertus Tammes (botanist), nephews
- Scientific career
- Fields: Botany, genetics
- Academic advisors: Jan Willem Moll, Hugo de Vries
- Author abbrev. (botany): Tammes

Jantina "Tine" Tammes (Dutch pronunciation: [jɑnˈtinaː ˈtinə ˈtɑməs]; 23 June 1871 – 20 September 1947) was a Dutch botanist and geneticist and the first professor of genetics in the Netherlands.

== Early life and education ==
Tammes was born on 23 June 1871 in Groningen in the Netherlands. She was the daughter of chocolate manufacturer Beerend Tammes and Swaantje Pot. She had a sister and four brothers, and was the aunt of the international lawyer Arnold Tammes and the botanist Pieter Merkus Lambertus Tammes, after whom the Tammes problem in mathematics is named.

After graduating from the high school for girls in Groningen and taking private lessons in mathematics, physics and chemistry, she enrolled at the University of Groningen in 1890 as one of just eleven female students. She was allowed to attend lectures but not to take any examinations, although she was awarded a teaching diploma.

== Research career ==
In 1897 Tammes was appointed as an assistant to Jan Willem Moll, professor of botany at the University of Groningen. Through his mediation she was invited in 1898 to spend several months doing research in the laboratory of Hugo de Vries, who had just been appointed adjunct professor of plant physiology at the newly founded University of Amsterdam. There she gained exposure to issues of variability, evolution and genetics. In 1901 she was the first woman in the Netherlands to be awarded a scholarship from the Buitenzorg Fund to conduct botanic research in Java, one of the few to achieve this without being a doctoral student. However, her poor health prevented her from travelling to the Far East and Moll offered her an unpaid place in his laboratory instead.

Over the next decade Tammes published several influential works. In Die Periodicität morphologischer Erscheinungen bei den Pflanzen (The frequency of morphological phenomena in plants) she was one of the first Dutch scientists to report on variability, evolution and genetics. Then in 1907 she published Der Flachsstengel: Eine statistisch-anatomische Monographie (The Flax Stem: A statistical anatomical monograph) which used statistics and probability theory to shed light on the inheritance of genetic traits in flax.

In 1911 Tammes was granted an honorary doctorate in zoology and botany. From April 1912 she replaced Moll as head of practical microscopy. In 1919 she was appointed extraordinary professor of variability and genetics, the first professor in the Netherlands in this field of research.

From 1932 to 1943 Tammes was editor of the journal Genetica. She was also active in the Dutch Association of Women In Higher Education (Vereniging van Vrouwen met Hogere Opleiding or VVAO) and an outspoken opponent of the principle of eugenics. Tammes died in Groningen in 1947.

== See also ==
- Timeline of women in science
