= Half-integer =

Rational number equal to an integer plus 1/2

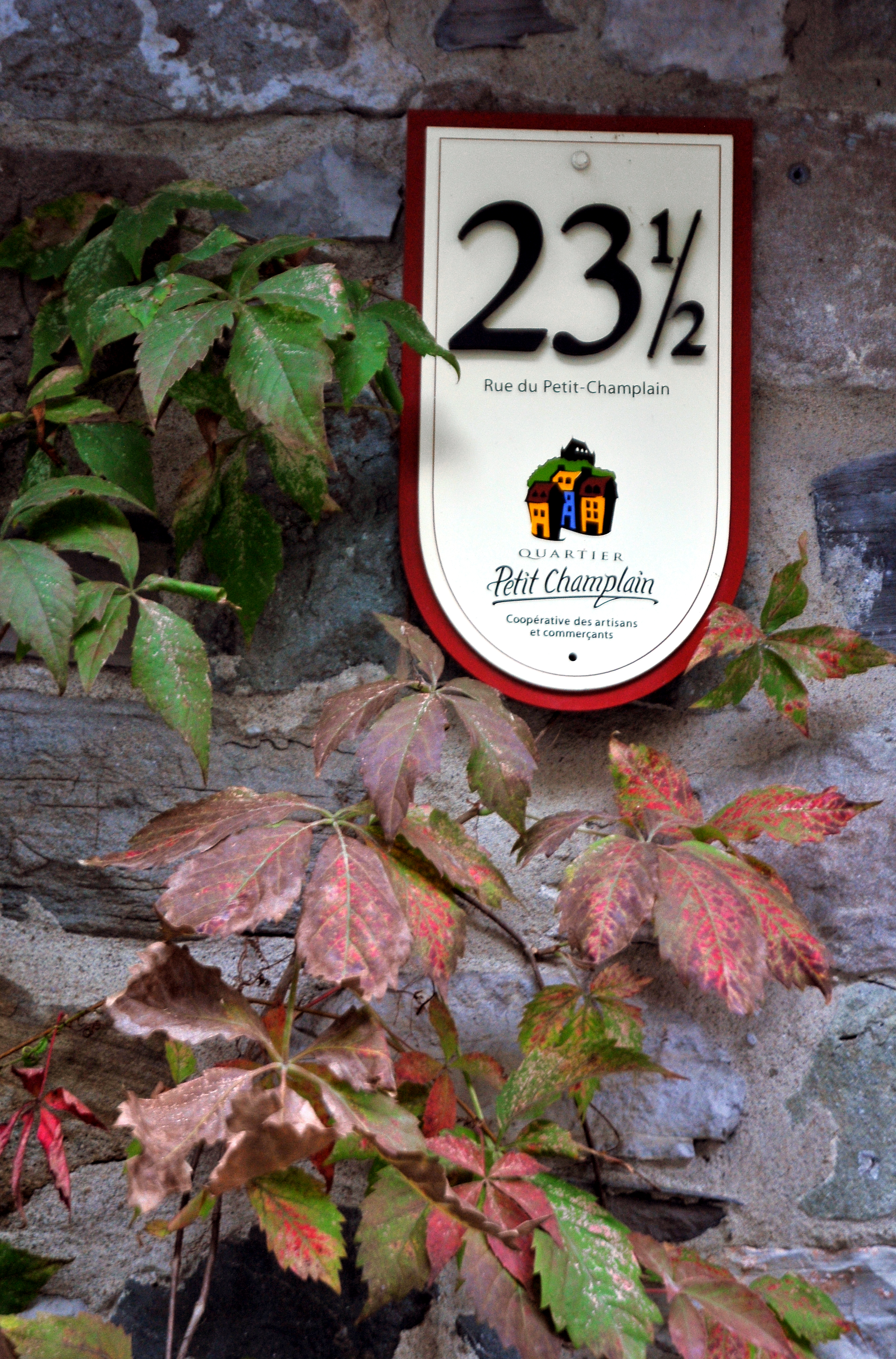
Half-integer house number in Quebec City

In mathematics, a half-integer is a number of the form
$$n + \tfrac{1}{2},$$
where $n$ is an integer. For example,
$$4\tfrac12,\quad 7/2,\quad -\tfrac{13}{2},\quad 8.5$$
are all half-integers. The name "half-integer" is perhaps misleading, as each integer $n$ is itself half of the integer $2n$. A name such as "integer-plus-half" may be more accurate, but while not literally true, "half integer" is the conventional term.

Note that halving an integer does not always produce a half-integer; this is only true for odd integers. For this reason, half-integers are also sometimes called half-odd-integers. Half-integers are a subset of the dyadic rationals (numbers produced by dividing an integer by a power of two).

== Notation and algebraic structure ==
The set of all half-integers is often denoted
$$\mathbb Z + \tfrac{1}{2} \quad = \quad \left( \tfrac{1}{2} \mathbb Z \right) \smallsetminus \mathbb Z ~.$$
The integers and half-integers together form a group under the addition operation, which may be denoted
$$\tfrac{1}{2} \mathbb Z ~.$$
However, these numbers do not form a ring because the product of two half-integers is not a half-integer; e.g. $~\tfrac{1}{2} \times \tfrac{1}{2} ~=~ \tfrac{1}{4} ~ \notin ~ \tfrac{1}{2} \mathbb Z ~.$ The smallest ring containing them is $\Z\left[\tfrac12\right]$, the ring of dyadic rationals.

== Properties ==
- The sum of $n$ half-integers is a half-integer if and only if $n$ is odd. This includes $n=0$ since the empty sum 0 is not half-integer.
- The negative of a half-integer is a half-integer.
- The cardinality of the set of half-integers is equal to that of the integers. This is due to the existence of a bijection from the integers to the half-integers: $f:x\to x+0.5$, where $x$ is an integer.

== Uses ==
=== Sphere packing ===
The densest lattice packing of unit spheres in four dimensions (called the D_{4} lattice) places a sphere at every point whose coordinates are either all integers or all half-integers. This packing is closely related to the Hurwitz integers: quaternions whose real coefficients are either all integers or all half-integers.

=== Physics ===
In physics, the Pauli exclusion principle results from definition of fermions as particles which have spins that are half-integers.

The energy levels of the quantum harmonic oscillator occur at half-integers and thus its lowest energy is not zero.

=== Sphere volume ===
Although the factorial function is defined only for integer arguments, it can be extended to fractional arguments using the gamma function. The gamma function for half-integers is an important part of the formula for the volume of an n-dimensional ball of radius $R$,
$$V_n(R) = \frac{\pi^{n/2}}{\Gamma(\frac{n}{2} + 1)}R^n~.$$
The values of the gamma function on half-integers are rational multiples of the square root of pi:
$$\Gamma\left(\tfrac{1}{2} + n\right) ~=~ \frac{\,(2n-1)!!\,}{2^n}\, \sqrt{\pi\,} ~=~ \frac{(2n)!}{\,4^n \, n!\,} \sqrt{\pi\,} ~$$
where $n!!$ denotes the double factorial.
