= Jan Willem Moll =

Dutch botanist and plant physiologist

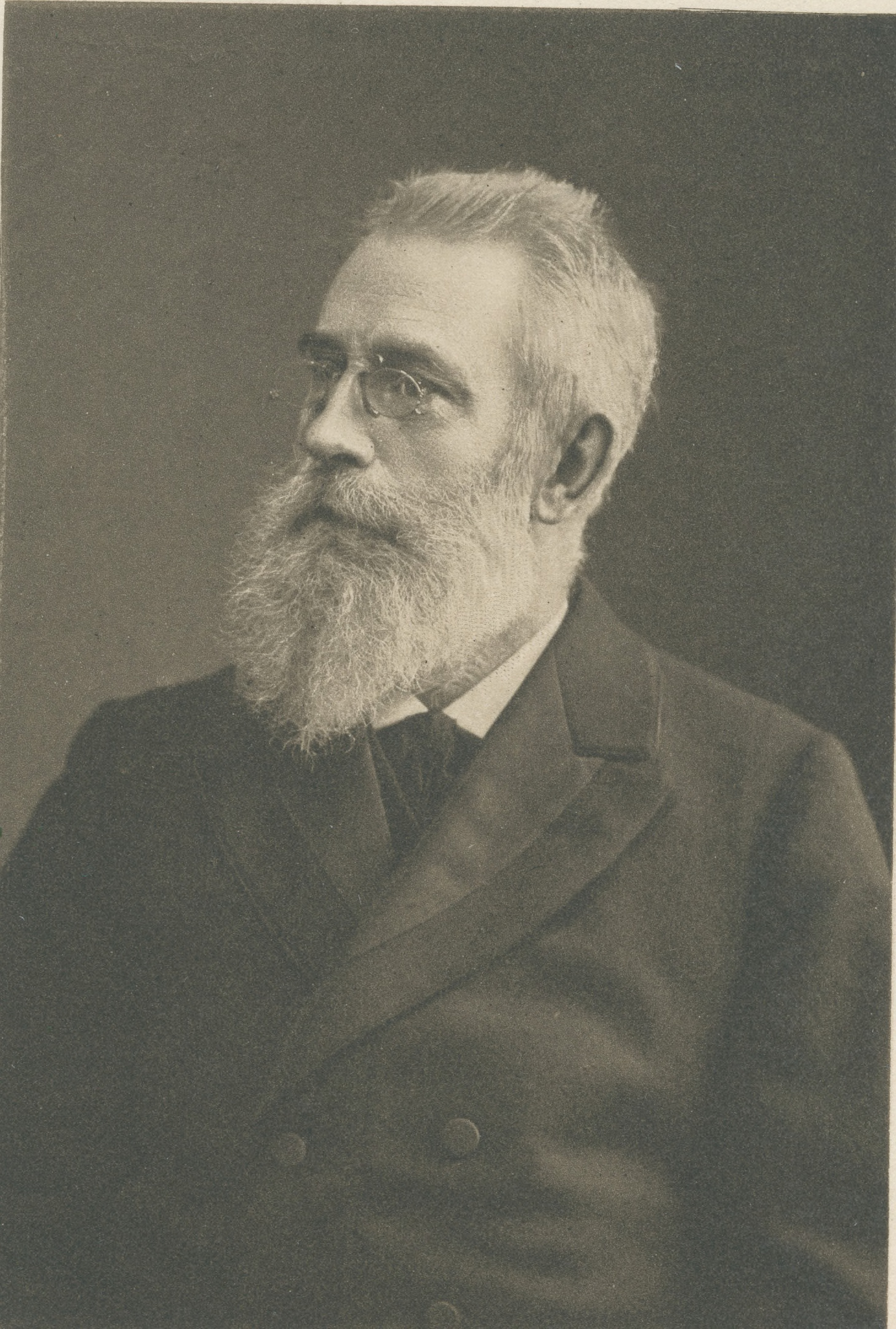

Jan Willem Moll (3 June 1851 – 24 September 1933) was a Dutch botanist and plant physiologist who worked as a professor at the University of Groningen. A major work by him was a systematic catalog of European fungi, the Enumeratio systematica fungorum in omnium herbarum.

Moll was born in Amsterdam to Annetta Elisabeth Henriette Theodora Voet and Dr Willem Moll. He studied at the Athenaeum Illustre, Amsterdam before going to Leiden University. He taught for a while in Utrecht before he became a professor at the University of Groningen in 1890 and served as Rector Magnificus of the University in 1909-10. He was a close associate of Hugo de Vries and his student Tine Tammes worked on Mendelian inheritance of quantitative traits. He developed both laboratory and field techniques for conducting experiments on plant physiology. He helped establish agricultural education and research in the Netherlands.
