= Thomson problem =

Arrangement of points on a sphere

The objective of the Thomson problem is to determine the minimum electrostatic potential energy configuration of N electrons constrained to the surface of a unit sphere that repel each other with a force given by Coulomb's law. The physicist J. J. Thomson posed the problem in 1904 after proposing an atomic model, later called the plum pudding model, based on his knowledge of the existence of negatively charged electrons within neutrally-charged atoms.

Related problems include the study of the geometry of the minimum energy configuration and the study of the large N behavior of the minimum energy.

== Mathematical statement ==
The electrostatic interaction energy occurring between each pair of electrons of equal charges ($e_i = e_j = e$, with $e$ the elementary charge of an electron) is given by Coulomb's law,

$$U_{ij}(N)={e_i e_j \over 4\pi\epsilon_0 r_{ij}},$$

where $\epsilon_0$ is the electric constant and $r_{ij}=|\mathbf{r}_i - \mathbf{r}_j|$ is the distance between each pair of electrons located at points on the sphere defined by vectors $\mathbf{r}_i$ and $\mathbf{r}_j$, respectively.

Simplified units of $e=1$ and $k_e=1/4\pi\epsilon_0=1$ (the Coulomb constant) are used without loss of generality. Then,

$$U_{ij}(N) = {1 \over r_{ij}}.$$

The total electrostatic potential energy of each N-electron configuration may then be expressed as the sum of all pair-wise interaction energies

$$U(N) = \sum_{i < j} \frac{1}{r_{ij}}.$$

The global minimization of $U(N)$ over all possible configurations of N distinct points is typically found by numerical minimization algorithms.

Thomson's problem is related to the 7th of the eighteen unsolved mathematics problems proposed by the mathematician Steve Smale — "Distribution of points on the 2-sphere". The main difference is that in Smale's problem the function to minimise is not the electrostatic potential $1 \over r_{ij}$ but a logarithmic potential given by $-\log r_{ij}.$ A second difference is that Smale's question is about the asymptotic behaviour of the total potential when the number N of points goes to infinity, not for concrete values of N.

=== Example ===
The solution of the Thomson problem for two electrons is obtained when both electrons are as far apart as possible on opposite sides of the origin, $r_{ij} = 2r = 2$, or

$$U(2) = {1 \over 2}.$$

== Known exact solutions ==
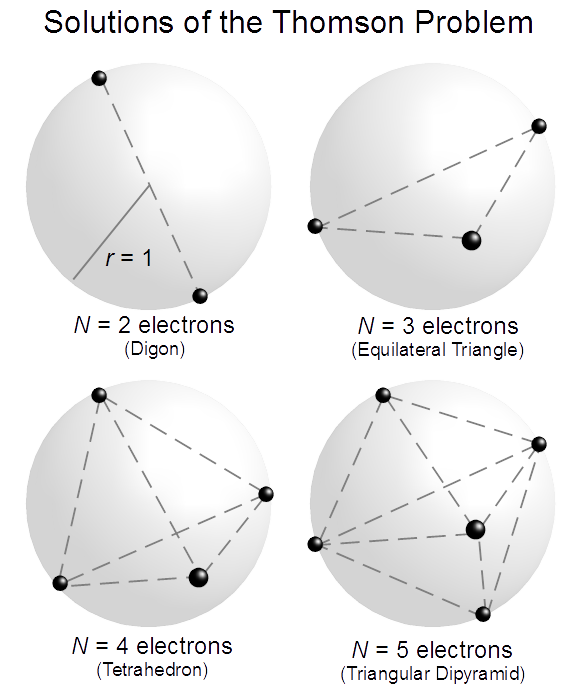
Schematic geometric solutions of the mathematical Thomson Problem for up to N = 5 electrons.

Mathematically exact minimum energy configurations have been rigorously identified in only a handful of cases.

- For N = 1, the solution is trivial. The single electron may reside at any point on the surface of the unit sphere. The total energy of the configuration is defined as zero because the charge of the electron is subject to no electric field due to other sources of charge.
- For N = 2, the optimal configuration consists of electrons at antipodal points.
- For N = 3, electrons reside at the vertices of an equilateral triangle about any great circle. The great circle is often considered to define an equator about the sphere and the two points perpendicular to the plane are often considered poles to aid in discussions about the electrostatic configurations of many-N electron solutions.
- For N = 4, electrons reside at the vertices of a regular tetrahedron.
- For N = 5, electrons reside at the vertices of a triangular bipyramid.
- For N = 6, electrons reside at vertices of a regular octahedron. The configuration may also be described as four electrons residing at the corners of a square about the equator and the remaining two residing at the poles.
- For N = 8, electrons reside at the vertices of a square antiprism.
- For N = 12, electrons reside at the vertices of a regular icosahedron.

The solutions of the Thomson problem for N = 4, 6, and 12 electrons are Platonic solids whose faces are all congruent equilateral triangles. Numerical solutions for N = 8 and 20 are not the regular convex polyhedral configurations of the remaining two Platonic solids (the cube and dodecahedron, respectively).

For N = 7, computational solutions have long returned a pentagonal bipyramid. In September 2026, Hung Tran, a researcher at AI benchmark company Vals AI, claimed an exact proof of this, accepted by the Lean kernel, found by ten Claude Sonnet 5.5 agents over 15 hours. The proof builds on the N = 8 result of Kryvonos, Liehr, and Taylor, which has also been verfied in Lean.

== Generalizations ==
One can also ask for ground states of particles interacting with arbitrary potentials. To be mathematically precise, let f be a decreasing real-valued function, and define the energy functional

$$\sum_{i < j} f(|x_i-x_j|).$$

Traditionally, one considers $f(x)=x^{-\alpha}$ also known as Riesz $\alpha$-kernels. For integrable Riesz kernels see the 1972 work of Landkof. For non-integrable Riesz kernels, the poppy-seed bagel theorem holds, see the 2004 work of Hardin and Saff. Notable cases include:

- α = ∞, the Tammes problem (packing);
- α = 1, the Thomson problem;
- α = 0, to maximize the product of distances, latterly known as Whyte's problem;
- α = −1 : maximum average distance problem.

One may also consider configurations of N points on a sphere of higher dimension. See spherical design.

== Solution algorithms ==
Several algorithms have been applied to this problem. The focus since the millennium has been on local optimization methods applied to the energy function, although random walks have made their appearance:

- constrained global optimization (Altschuler et al. 1994),
- steepest descent (Claxton and Benson 1966, Erber and Hockney 1991),
- random walk (Weinrach et al. 1990),
- genetic algorithm (Morris et al. 1996)

While the objective is to minimize the global electrostatic potential energy of each N-electron case, several algorithmic starting cases are of interest.

=== Continuous spherical shell charge ===
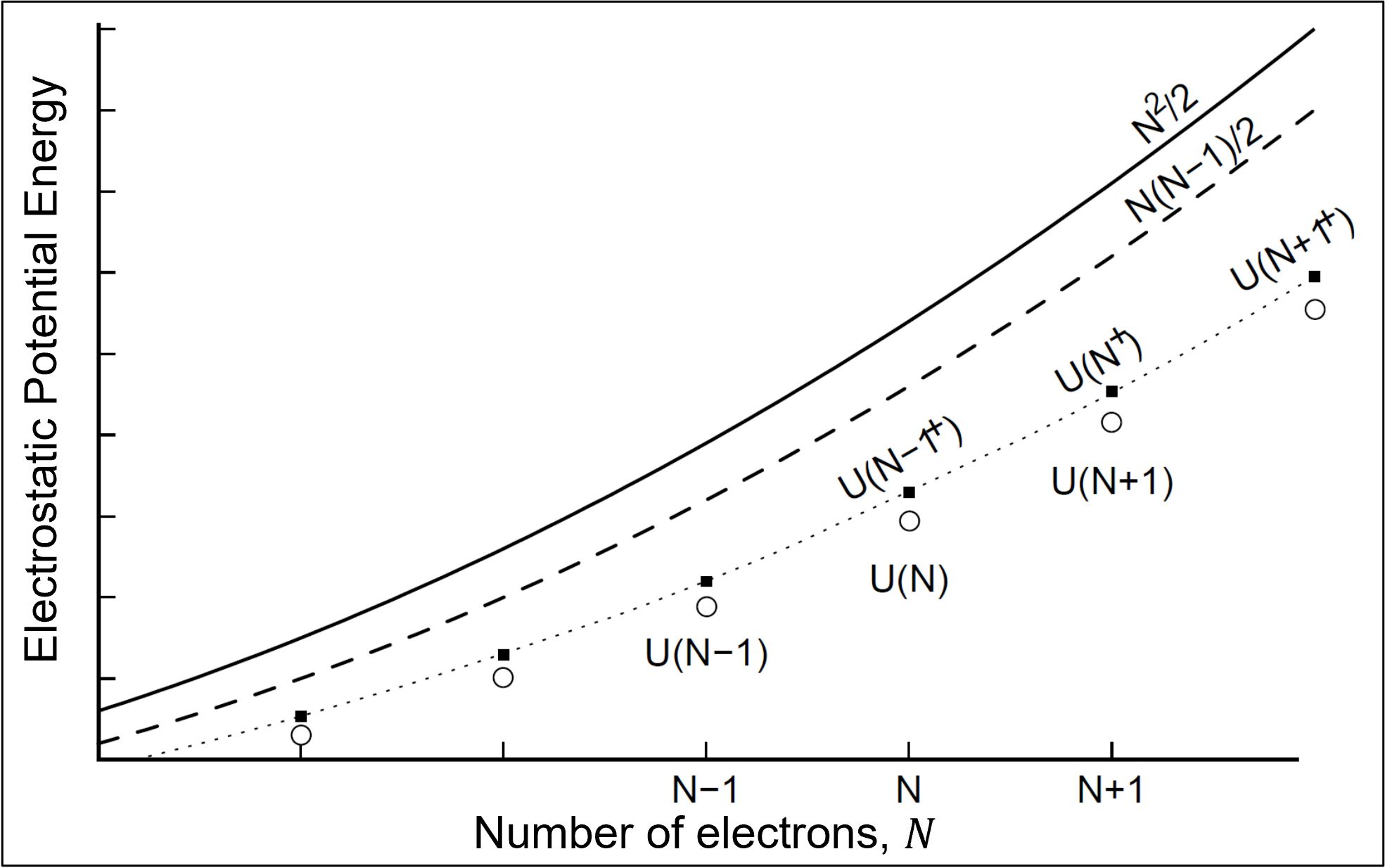
The extreme upper energy limit of the Thomson Problem is given by $N^2/2$ for a continuous shell charge followed by N(N − 1)/2, the energy associated with a random distribution of N electrons. Significantly lower energy of a given N-electron solution of the Thomson Problem with one charge at its origin is readily obtained by $U(N) + N$, where $U(N)$ are solutions of the Thomson Problem.

The energy of a continuous spherical shell of charge distributed across its surface is given by

$$U_{\text{shell}}(N)=\frac{N^2}{2}$$

and is, in general, greater than the energy of every Thomson problem solution. Note: Here N is used as a continuous variable that represents the infinitely divisible charge, Q, distributed across the spherical shell. For example, a spherical shell of $N=1$ represents the uniform distribution of a single electron's charge, $-e$, across the entire shell.

=== Randomly distributed point charges ===
The expected global energy of a system of electrons distributed in a purely random manner across the surface of the sphere is given by

$$U_{\text{rand}}(N)=\frac{N(N-1)}{2}$$

and is, in general, greater than the energy of every Thomson problem solution.

Here, N is a discrete variable that counts the number of electrons in the system. As well, $U_{\text{rand}}(N) < U_{\text{shell}}(N)$.

=== Charge-centered distribution ===
For every Nth solution of the Thomson problem there is an $(N+1)$th configuration that includes an electron at the origin of the sphere whose energy is simply the addition of N to the energy of the Nth solution. That is,

$$U_0(N+1)=U_{\text{Thom}}(N)+N.$$

Thus, if $U_{\text{Thom}}(N)$ is known exactly, then $U_0(N+1)$ is known exactly.

In general, $U_0(N+1)$ is greater than $U_{\text{Thom}}(N+1)$, but is remarkably closer to each $(N+1)$th Thomson solution than $U_{\text{shell}}(N+1)$ and $U_{\text{rand}}(N+1)$. Therefore, the charge-centered distribution represents a smaller "energy gap" to cross to arrive at a solution of each Thomson problem than algorithms that begin with the other two charge configurations.

== Relations to other scientific problems ==
The Thomson problem is a natural consequence of J. J. Thomson's plum pudding model in the absence of its uniform positive background charge.

"No fact discovered about the atom can be trivial, nor fail to accelerate the progress of physical science, for the greater part of natural philosophy is the outcome of the structure and mechanism of the atom."

— Sir J. J. Thomson

Though experimental evidence led to the abandonment of Thomson's plum pudding model as a complete atomic model, irregularities observed in numerical energy solutions of the Thomson problem have been found to correspond with electron shell-filling in naturally occurring atoms throughout the periodic table of elements.

The Thomson problem also plays a role in the study of other physical models including multi-electron bubbles and the surface ordering of liquid metal drops confined in Paul traps.

The generalized Thomson problem arises, for example, in determining arrangements of protein subunits that comprise the shells of spherical viruses. The "particles" in this application are clusters of protein subunits arranged on a shell. Other realizations include regular arrangements of colloid particles in colloidosomes, proposed for encapsulation of active ingredients such as drugs, nutrients or living cells, fullerene patterns of carbon atoms, and VSEPR theory. An example with long-range logarithmic interactions is provided by Abrikosov vortices that form at low temperatures in a superconducting metal shell with a large monopole at its center.

== Configurations of smallest known energy ==
In the following table $N$ is the number of points (charges) in a configuration, $U_{\textrm{Thom}}$ is the energy, the symmetry type is given in Schönflies notation (see Point groups in three dimensions), and $r_i$ are the positions of the charges. Most symmetry types require the vector sum of the positions (and thus the electric dipole moment) to be zero.

It is customary to also consider the polyhedron formed by the convex hull of the points. Thus, $v_i$ is the number of vertices where the given number of edges meet, $e$ is the total number of edges, $f_3$ is the number of triangular faces, $f_4$ is the number of quadrilateral faces, and $\theta_1$ is the smallest angle subtended by vectors associated with the nearest charge pair. The edge lengths are generally not equal. Thus, except in the cases N = 2, 3, 4, 6, 12, and the geodesic polyhedra, the convex hull is only topologically equivalent to the figure listed in the last column.

N	$U_{\textrm{Thom}}$	Symmetry	$\left| \sum \mathbf{r}_i \right|$	$v_3$	$v_4$	$v_5$	$v_6$	$v_7$	$v_8$	$e$	$f_3$	$f_4$	$\theta_1$	Equivalent polyhedron
2	0.500000000	$D_{\infty h}$	0	–	–	–	–	–	–	1	–	–	180.000°	digon
3	1.732050808	$D_{3h}$	0	–	–	–	–	–	–	3	2	–	120.000°	triangle
4	3.674234614	$T_d$	0	4	0	0	0	0	0	6	4	0	109.471°	tetrahedron
5	6.474691495	$D_{3h}$	0	2	3	0	0	0	0	9	6	0	90.000°	triangular dipyramid
6	9.985281374	$O_h$	0	0	6	0	0	0	0	12	8	0	90.000°	octahedron
7	14.452977414	$D_{5h}$	0	0	5	2	0	0	0	15	10	0	72.000°	pentagonal dipyramid
8	19.675287861	$D_{4d}$	0	0	8	0	0	0	0	16	8	2	71.694°	square antiprism
9	25.759986531	$D_{3h}$	0	0	3	6	0	0	0	21	14	0	69.190°	triaugmented triangular prism
10	32.716949460	$D_{4d}$	0	0	2	8	0	0	0	24	16	0	64.996°	gyroelongated square dipyramid
11	40.596450510	$C_{2v}$	0.013219635	0	2	8	1	0	0	27	18	0	58.540°	edge-contracted icosahedron
12	49.165253058	$I_h$	0	0	0	12	0	0	0	30	20	0	63.435°	icosahedron (geodesic sphere {3,5+}_{1,0})
13	58.853230612	$C_{2v}$	0.008820367	0	1	10	2	0	0	33	22	0	52.317°	
14	69.306363297	$D_{6d}$	0	0	0	12	2	0	0	36	24	0	52.866°	gyroelongated hexagonal dipyramid
15	80.670244114	$D_3$	0	0	0	12	3	0	0	39	26	0	49.225°	
16	92.911655302	$T$	0	0	0	12	4	0	0	42	28	0	48.936°	tetrahedrally diminished dodecahedron
17	106.050404829	$D_{5h}$	0	0	0	12	5	0	0	45	30	0	50.108°	double-gyroelongated pentagonal dipyramid
18	120.084467447	$D_{4d}$	0	0	2	8	8	0	0	48	32	0	47.534°	
19	135.089467557	$C_{2v}$	0.000135163	0	0	14	5	0	0	50	32	1	44.910°	
20	150.881568334	$D_{3h}$	0	0	0	12	8	0	0	54	36	0	46.093°	
21	167.641622399	$C_{2v}$	0.001406124	0	1	10	10	0	0	57	38	0	44.321°	
22	185.287536149	$T_d$	0	0	0	12	10	0	0	60	40	0	43.302°	
23	203.930190663	$D_3$	0	0	0	12	11	0	0	63	42	0	41.481°	
24	223.347074052	$O$	0	0	0	24	0	0	0	60	32	6	42.065°	snub cube
25	243.812760299	$C_s$	0.001021305	0	0	14	11	0	0	68	44	1	39.610°	
26	265.133326317	$C_2$	0.001919065	0	0	12	14	0	0	72	48	0	38.842°	
27	287.302615033	$D_{5h}$	0	0	0	12	15	0	0	75	50	0	39.940°	
28	310.491542358	$T$	0	0	0	12	16	0	0	78	52	0	37.824°	
29	334.634439920	$D_3$	0	0	0	12	17	0	0	81	54	0	36.391°	
30	359.603945904	$D_2$	0	0	0	12	18	0	0	84	56	0	36.942°	
31	385.530838063	$C_{3v}$	0.003204712	0	0	12	19	0	0	87	58	0	36.373°	
32	412.261274651	$I_h$	0	0	0	12	20	0	0	90	60	0	37.377°	pentakis dodecahedron (geodesic sphere {3,5+}_{1,1})
33	440.204057448	$C_s$	0.004356481	0	0	15	17	1	0	92	60	1	33.700°	
34	468.904853281	$D_2$	0	0	0	12	22	0	0	96	64	0	33.273°	
35	498.569872491	$C_2$	0.000419208	0	0	12	23	0	0	99	66	0	33.100°	
36	529.122408375	$D_2$	0	0	0	12	24	0	0	102	68	0	33.229°	
37	560.618887731	$D_{5h}$	0	0	0	12	25	0	0	105	70	0	32.332°	
38	593.038503566	$D_{6d}$	0	0	0	12	26	0	0	108	72	0	33.236°	
39	626.389009017	$D_{3h}$	0	0	0	12	27	0	0	111	74	0	32.053°	
40	660.675278835	$T_d$	0	0	0	12	28	0	0	114	76	0	31.916°	
41	695.916744342	$D_{3h}$	0	0	0	12	29	0	0	117	78	0	31.528°	
42	732.078107544	$D_{5h}$	0	0	0	12	30	0	0	120	80	0	31.245°	
43	769.190846459	$C_{2v}$	0.000399668	0	0	12	31	0	0	123	82	0	30.867°	
44	807.174263085	$O_h$	0	0	0	24	20	0	0	120	72	6	31.258°	
45	846.188401061	$D_3$	0	0	0	12	33	0	0	129	86	0	30.207°	
46	886.167113639	$T$	0	0	0	12	34	0	0	132	88	0	29.790°	
47	927.059270680	$C_s$	0.002482914	0	0	14	33	0	0	134	88	1	28.787°	
48	968.713455344	$O$	0	0	0	24	24	0	0	132	80	6	29.690°	
49	1011.557182654	$C_3$	0.001529341	0	0	12	37	0	0	141	94	0	28.387°	
50	1055.182314726	$D_{6d}$	0	0	0	12	38	0	0	144	96	0	29.231°	
51	1099.819290319	$D_3$	0	0	0	12	39	0	0	147	98	0	28.165°	
52	1145.418964319	$C_3$	0.000457327	0	0	12	40	0	0	150	100	0	27.670°	
53	1191.922290416	$C_{2v}$	0.000278469	0	0	18	35	0	0	150	96	3	27.137°	
54	1239.361474729	$C_2$	0.000137870	0	0	12	42	0	0	156	104	0	27.030°	
55	1287.772720783	$C_2$	0.000391696	0	0	12	43	0	0	159	106	0	26.615°	
56	1337.094945276	$D_2$	0	0	0	12	44	0	0	162	108	0	26.683°	
57	1387.383229253	$D_{3}$	0	0	0	12	45	0	0	165	110	0	26.702°	
58	1438.618250640	$D_2$	0	0	0	12	46	0	0	168	112	0	26.155°	
59	1490.773335279	$C_2$	0.000154286	0	0	14	43	2	0	171	114	0	26.170°	
60	1543.830400976	$D_3$	0	0	0	12	48	0	0	174	116	0	25.958°	
61	1597.941830199	$C_1$	0.001091717	0	0	12	49	0	0	177	118	0	25.392°	
62	1652.909409898	$D_{5}$	0	0	0	12	50	0	0	180	120	0	25.880°	
63	1708.879681503	$D_{3}$	0	0	0	12	51	0	0	183	122	0	25.257°	
64	1765.802577927	$D_{2}$	0	0	0	12	52	0	0	186	124	0	24.920°	
65	1823.667960264	$C_{2}$	0.000399515	0	0	12	53	0	0	189	126	0	24.527°	
66	1882.441525304	$C_{2}$	0.000776245	0	0	12	54	0	0	192	128	0	24.765°	
67	1942.122700406	$D_{5}$	0	0	0	12	55	0	0	195	130	0	24.727°	
68	2002.874701749	$D_{2}$	0	0	0	12	56	0	0	198	132	0	24.433°	
69	2064.533483235	$D_{3}$	0	0	0	12	57	0	0	201	134	0	24.137°	
70	2127.100901551	$D_{2d}$	0	0	0	12	50	0	0	200	128	4	24.291°	
71	2190.649906425	$C_{2}$	0.001256769	0	0	14	55	2	0	207	138	0	23.803°	
72	2255.001190975	$I$	0	0	0	12	60	0	0	210	140	0	24.492°	geodesic sphere {3,5+}_{2,1}
73	2320.633883745	$C_{2}$	0.001572959	0	0	12	61	0	0	213	142	0	22.810°	
74	2387.072981838	$C_{2}$	0.000641539	0	0	12	62	0	0	216	144	0	22.966°	
75	2454.369689040	$D_{3}$	0	0	0	12	63	0	0	219	146	0	22.736°	
76	2522.674871841	$C_{2}$	0.000943474	0	0	12	64	0	0	222	148	0	22.886°	
77	2591.850152354	$D_{5}$	0	0	0	12	65	0	0	225	150	0	23.286°	
78	2662.046474566	$T_{h}$	0	0	0	12	66	0	0	228	152	0	23.426°	
79	2733.248357479	$C_{1}$	0.000702921	0	0	13	65	1	0	230	152	1	22.636°	
80	2805.355875981	$D_{4d}$	0	0	0	16	64	0	0	232	152	2	22.778°	
81	2878.522829664	$C_{2}$	0.000194289	0	0	12	69	0	0	237	158	0	21.892°	
82	2952.569675286	$D_{2}$	0	0	0	12	70	0	0	240	160	0	22.206°	
83	3027.528488921	$C_{2}$	0.000339815	0	0	14	67	2	0	243	162	0	21.646°	
84	3103.465124431	$C_{2}$	0.000401973	0	0	12	72	0	0	246	164	0	21.513°	
85	3180.361442939	$C_{2}$	0.000416581	0	0	12	73	0	0	249	166	0	21.498°	
86	3258.211605713	$C_{2}$	0.001378932	0	0	12	74	0	0	252	168	0	21.522°	
87	3337.000750014	$C_{2}$	0.000754863	0	0	12	75	0	0	255	170	0	21.456°	
88	3416.720196758	$D_{2}$	0	0	0	12	76	0	0	258	172	0	21.486°	
89	3497.439018625	$C_{2}$	0.000070891	0	0	12	77	0	0	261	174	0	21.182°	
90	3579.091222723	$D_{3}$	0	0	0	12	78	0	0	264	176	0	21.230°	
91	3661.713699320	$C_{2}$	0.000033221	0	0	12	79	0	0	267	178	0	21.105°	
92	3745.291636241	$D_{2}$	0	0	0	12	80	0	0	270	180	0	21.026°	
93	3829.844338421	$C_{2}$	0.000213246	0	0	12	81	0	0	273	182	0	20.751°	
94	3915.309269620	$D_{2}$	0	0	0	12	82	0	0	276	184	0	20.952°	
95	4001.771675565	$C_{2}$	0.000116638	0	0	12	83	0	0	279	186	0	20.711°	
96	4089.154010060	$C_{2}$	0.000036310	0	0	12	84	0	0	282	188	0	20.687°	
97	4177.533599622	$C_{2}$	0.000096437	0	0	12	85	0	0	285	190	0	20.450°	
98	4266.822464156	$C_{2}$	0.000112916	0	0	12	86	0	0	288	192	0	20.422°	
99	4357.139163132	$C_{2}$	0.000156508	0	0	12	87	0	0	291	194	0	20.284°	
100	4448.350634331	$T$	0	0	0	12	88	0	0	294	196	0	20.297°	
101	4540.590051694	$D_{3}$	0	0	0	12	89	0	0	297	198	0	20.011°	
102	4633.736565899	$D_{3}$	0	0	0	12	90	0	0	300	200	0	20.040°	
103	4727.836616833	$C_{2}$	0.000201245	0	0	12	91	0	0	303	202	0	19.907°	
104	4822.876522746	$D_{6}$	0	0	0	12	92	0	0	306	204	0	19.957°	
105	4919.000637616	$D_{3}$	0	0	0	12	93	0	0	309	206	0	19.842°	
106	5015.984595705	$D_{2}$	0	0	0	12	94	0	0	312	208	0	19.658°	
107	5113.953547724	$C_{2}$	0.000064137	0	0	12	95	0	0	315	210	0	19.327°	
108	5212.813507831	$C_{2}$	0.000432525	0	0	12	96	0	0	318	212	0	19.327°	
109	5312.735079920	$C_{2}$	0.000647299	0	0	14	93	2	0	321	214	0	19.103°	
110	5413.549294192	$D_{6}$	0	0	0	12	98	0	0	324	216	0	19.476°	
111	5515.293214587	$D_{3}$	0	0	0	12	99	0	0	327	218	0	19.255°	
112	5618.044882327	$D_{5}$	0	0	0	12	100	0	0	330	220	0	19.351°	
113	5721.824978027	$D_{3}$	0	0	0	12	101	0	0	333	222	0	18.978°	
114	5826.521572163	$C_{2}$	0.000149772	0	0	12	102	0	0	336	224	0	18.836°	
115	5932.181285777	$C_{3}$	0.000049972	0	0	12	103	0	0	339	226	0	18.458°	
116	6038.815593579	$C_{2}$	0.000259726	0	0	12	104	0	0	342	228	0	18.386°	
117	6146.342446579	$C_{2}$	0.000127609	0	0	12	105	0	0	345	230	0	18.566°	
118	6254.877027790	$C_{2}$	0.000332475	0	0	12	106	0	0	348	232	0	18.455°	
119	6364.347317479	$C_{2}$	0.000685590	0	0	12	107	0	0	351	234	0	18.336°	
120	6474.756324980	$C_{s}$	0.001373062	0	0	12	108	0	0	354	236	0	18.418°	
121	6586.121949584	$C_{3}$	0.000838863	0	0	12	109	0	0	357	238	0	18.199°	
122	6698.374499261	$I_{h}$	0	0	0	12	110	0	0	360	240	0	18.612°	geodesic sphere {3,5+}_{2,2}
123	6811.827228174	$C_{2v}$	0.001939754	0	0	14	107	2	0	363	242	0	17.840°	
124	6926.169974193	$D_{2}$	0	0	0	12	112	0	0	366	244	0	18.111°	
125	7041.473264023	$C_{2}$	0.000088274	0	0	12	113	0	0	369	246	0	17.867°	
126	7157.669224867	$D_{4}$	0	0	2	16	100	8	0	372	248	0	17.920°	
127	7274.819504675	$D_{5}$	0	0	0	12	115	0	0	375	250	0	17.877°	
128	7393.007443068	$C_{2}$	0.000054132	0	0	12	116	0	0	378	252	0	17.814°	
129	7512.107319268	$C_{2}$	0.000030099	0	0	12	117	0	0	381	254	0	17.743°	
130	7632.167378912	$C_{2}$	0.000025622	0	0	12	118	0	0	384	256	0	17.683°	
131	7753.205166941	$C_{2}$	0.000305133	0	0	12	119	0	0	387	258	0	17.511°	
132	7875.045342797	$I$	0	0	0	12	120	0	0	390	260	0	17.958°	geodesic sphere {3,5+}_{3,1}
133	7998.179212898	$C_{3}$	0.000591438	0	0	12	121	0	0	393	262	0	17.133°	
134	8122.089721194	$C_{2}$	0.000470268	0	0	12	122	0	0	396	264	0	17.214°	
135	8246.909486992	$D_{3}$	0	0	0	12	123	0	0	399	266	0	17.431°	
136	8372.743302539	$T$	0	0	0	12	124	0	0	402	268	0	17.485°	
137	8499.534494782	$D_{5}$	0	0	0	12	125	0	0	405	270	0	17.560°	
138	8627.406389880	$C_{2}$	0.000473576	0	0	12	126	0	0	408	272	0	16.924°	
139	8756.227056057	$C_{2}$	0.000404228	0	0	12	127	0	0	411	274	0	16.673°	
140	8885.980609041	$C_{1}$	0.000630351	0	0	13	126	1	0	414	276	0	16.773°	
141	9016.615349190	$C_{2v}$	0.000376365	0	0	14	126	0	1	417	278	0	16.962°	
142	9148.271579993	$C_{2}$	0.000550138	0	0	12	130	0	0	420	280	0	16.840°	
143	9280.839851192	$C_{2}$	0.000255449	0	0	12	131	0	0	423	282	0	16.782°	
144	9414.371794460	$D_{2}$	0	0	0	12	132	0	0	426	284	0	16.953°	
145	9548.928837232	$C_{s}$	0.000094938	0	0	12	133	0	0	429	286	0	16.841°	
146	9684.381825575	$D_{2}$	0	0	0	12	134	0	0	432	288	0	16.905°	
147	9820.932378373	$C_{2}$	0.000636651	0	0	12	135	0	0	435	290	0	16.458°	
148	9958.406004270	$C_{2}$	0.000203701	0	0	12	136	0	0	438	292	0	16.627°	
149	10096.859907397	$C_{1}$	0.000638186	0	0	14	133	2	0	441	294	0	16.344°	
150	10236.196436701	$T$	0	0	0	12	138	0	0	444	296	0	16.405°	
151	10376.571469275	$C_{2}$	0.000153836	0	0	12	139	0	0	447	298	0	16.163°	
152	10517.867592878	$D_{2}$	0	0	0	12	140	0	0	450	300	0	16.117°	
153	10660.082748237	$D_{3}$	0	0	0	12	141	0	0	453	302	0	16.390°	
154	10803.372421141	$C_{2}$	0.000735800	0	0	12	142	0	0	456	304	0	16.078°	
155	10947.574692279	$C_{2}$	0.000603670	0	0	12	143	0	0	459	306	0	15.990°	
156	11092.798311456	$C_{2}$	0.000508534	0	0	12	144	0	0	462	308	0	15.822°	
157	11238.903041156	$C_{2}$	0.000357679	0	0	12	145	0	0	465	310	0	15.948°	
158	11385.990186197	$C_{2}$	0.000921918	0	0	12	146	0	0	468	312	0	15.987°	
159	11534.023960956	$C_{2}$	0.000381457	0	0	12	147	0	0	471	314	0	15.960°	
160	11683.054805549	$D_{2}$	0	0	0	12	148	0	0	474	316	0	15.961°	
161	11833.084739465	$C_{2}$	0.000056447	0	0	12	149	0	0	477	318	0	15.810°	
162	11984.050335814	$D_{3}$	0	0	0	12	150	0	0	480	320	0	15.813°	
163	12136.013053220	$C_{2}$	0.000120798	0	0	12	151	0	0	483	322	0	15.675°	
164	12288.930105320	$D_{2}$	0	0	0	12	152	0	0	486	324	0	15.655°	
165	12442.804451373	$C_{2}$	0.000091119	0	0	12	153	0	0	489	326	0	15.651°	
166	12597.649071323	$D_{2d}$	0	0	0	16	146	4	0	492	328	0	15.607°	
167	12753.469429750	$C_{2}$	0.000097382	0	0	12	155	0	0	495	330	0	15.600°	
168	12910.212672268	$D_{3}$	0	0	0	12	156	0	0	498	332	0	15.655°	
169	13068.006451127	$C_{s}$	0.000068102	0	0	13	155	1	0	501	334	0	15.537°	
170	13226.681078541	$D_{2d}$	0	0	0	12	158	0	0	504	336	0	15.569°	
171	13386.355930717	$D_{3}$	0	0	0	12	159	0	0	507	338	0	15.497°	
172	13547.018108787	$C_{2v}$	0.000547291	0	0	14	156	2	0	510	340	0	15.292°	
173	13708.635243034	$C_{s}$	0.000286544	0	0	12	161	0	0	513	342	0	15.225°	
174	13871.187092292	$D_{2}$	0	0	0	12	162	0	0	516	344	0	15.366°	
175	14034.781306929	$C_{2}$	0.000026686	0	0	12	163	0	0	519	346	0	15.252°	
176	14199.354775632	$C_{1}$	0.000283978	0	0	12	164	0	0	522	348	0	15.101°	
177	14364.837545298	$D_{5}$	0	0	0	12	165	0	0	525	350	0	15.269°	
178	14531.309552587	$D_{2}$	0	0	0	12	166	0	0	528	352	0	15.145°	
179	14698.754594220	$C_{1}$	0.000125113	0	0	13	165	1	0	531	354	0	14.968°	
180	14867.099927525	$D_{2}$	0	0	0	12	168	0	0	534	356	0	15.067°	
181	15036.467239769	$C_{2}$	0.000304193	0	0	12	169	0	0	537	358	0	15.002°	
182	15206.730610906	$D_{5}$	0	0	0	12	170	0	0	540	360	0	15.155°	
183	15378.166571028	$C_{1}$	0.000467899	0	0	12	171	0	0	543	362	0	14.747°	
184	15550.421450311	$T$	0	0	0	12	172	0	0	546	364	0	14.932°	
185	15723.720074072	$C_{2}$	0.000389762	0	0	12	173	0	0	549	366	0	14.775°	
186	15897.897437048	$C_{1}$	0.000389762	0	0	12	174	0	0	552	368	0	14.739°	
187	16072.975186320	$D_{5}$	0	0	0	12	175	0	0	555	370	0	14.848°	
188	16249.222678879	$D_{2}$	0	0	0	12	176	0	0	558	372	0	14.740°	
189	16426.371938862	$C_{2}$	0.000020732	0	0	12	177	0	0	561	374	0	14.671°	
190	16604.428338501	$C_{3}$	0.000586804	0	0	12	178	0	0	564	376	0	14.501°	
191	16783.452219362	$C_{1}$	0.001129202	0	0	13	177	1	0	567	378	0	14.195°	
192	16963.338386460	$I$	0	0	0	12	180	0	0	570	380	0	14.819°	geodesic sphere {3,5+}_{3,2}
193	17144.564740880	$C_{2}$	0.000985192	0	0	12	181	0	0	573	382	0	14.144°	
194	17326.616136471	$C_{1}$	0.000322358	0	0	12	182	0	0	576	384	0	14.350°	
195	17509.489303930	$D_{3}$	0	0	0	12	183	0	0	579	386	0	14.375°	
196	17693.460548082	$C_{2}$	0.000315907	0	0	12	184	0	0	582	388	0	14.251°	
197	17878.340162571	$D_{5}$	0	0	0	12	185	0	0	585	390	0	14.147°	
198	18064.262177195	$C_{2}$	0.000011149	0	0	12	186	0	0	588	392	0	14.237°	
199	18251.082495640	$C_{1}$	0.000534779	0	0	12	187	0	0	591	394	0	14.153°	
200	18438.842717530	$D_{2}$	0	0	0	12	188	0	0	594	396	0	14.222°	
201	18627.591226244	$C_{1}$	0.001048859	0	0	13	187	1	0	597	398	0	13.830°	
202	18817.204718262	$D_{5}$	0	0	0	12	190	0	0	600	400	0	14.189°	
203	19007.981204580	$C_{s}$	0.000600343	0	0	12	191	0	0	603	402	0	13.977°	
204	19199.540775603	$T_{h}$	0	0	0	12	192	0	0	606	404	0	14.291°	
212	20768.053085964	$I$	0	0	0	12	200	0	0	630	420	0	14.118°	geodesic sphere {3,5+}_{4,1}
214	21169.910410375	$T$	0	0	0	12	202	0	0	636	424	0	13.771°	
216	21575.596377869	$D_{3}$	0	0	0	12	204	0	0	642	428	0	13.735°	
217	21779.856080418	$D_{5}$	0	0	0	12	205	0	0	645	430	0	13.902°	
232	24961.252318934	$T$	0	0	0	12	220	0	0	690	460	0	13.260°	
255	30264.424251281	$D_{3}$	0	0	0	12	243	0	0	759	506	0	12.565°	
256	30506.687515847	$T$	0	0	0	12	244	0	0	762	508	0	12.572°	
257	30749.941417346	$D_{5}$	0	0	0	12	245	0	0	765	510	0	12.672°	
272	34515.193292681	$I_{h}$	0	0	0	12	260	0	0	810	540	0	12.335°	geodesic sphere {3,5+}_{3,3}
282	37147.294418462	$I$	0	0	0	12	270	0	0	840	560	0	12.166°	geodesic sphere {3,5+}_{4,2}
292	39877.008012909	$D_{5}$	0	0	0	12	280	0	0	870	580	0	11.857°	
306	43862.569780797	$T_{h}$	0	0	0	12	294	0	0	912	608	0	11.628°	
312	45629.313804002	$C_{2}$	0.000306163	0	0	12	300	0	0	930	620	0	11.299°	
315	46525.825643432	$D_{3}$	0	0	0	12	303	0	0	939	626	0	11.337°	
317	47128.310344520	$D_{5}$	0	0	0	12	305	0	0	945	630	0	11.423°	
318	47431.056020043	$D_{3}$	0	0	0	12	306	0	0	948	632	0	11.219°	
334	52407.728127822	$T$	0	0	0	12	322	0	0	996	664	0	11.058°	
348	56967.472454334	$T_{h}$	0	0	0	12	336	0	0	1038	692	0	10.721°	
357	59999.922939598	$D_{5}$	0	0	0	12	345	0	0	1065	710	0	10.728°	
358	60341.830924588	$T$	0	0	0	12	346	0	0	1068	712	0	10.647°	
372	65230.027122557	$I$	0	0	0	12	360	0	0	1110	740	0	10.531°	geodesic sphere {3,5+}_{4,3}
382	68839.426839215	$D_{5}$	0	0	0	12	370	0	0	1140	760	0	10.379°	
390	71797.035335953	$T_{h}$	0	0	0	12	378	0	0	1164	776	0	10.222°	
392	72546.258370889	$C_{1}$	0	0	0	12	380	0	0	1170	780	0	10.278°	
400	75582.448512213	$T$	0	0	0	12	388	0	0	1194	796	0	10.068°	
402	76351.192432673	$D_{5}$	0	0	0	12	390	0	0	1200	800	0	10.099°	
432	88353.709681956	$D_{3}$	0	0	0	24	396	12	0	1290	860	0	9.556°	
448	95115.546986209	$T$	0	0	0	24	412	12	0	1338	892	0	9.322°	
460	100351.763108673	$T$	0	0	0	24	424	12	0	1374	916	0	9.297°	
468	103920.871715127	$S_{6}$	0	0	0	24	432	12	0	1398	932	0	9.120°	
470	104822.886324279	$S_{6}$	0	0	0	24	434	12	0	1404	936	0	9.059°	

According to a conjecture, if $P$ is the polyhedron formed by the convex hull of the solution configuration to the Thomson Problem for $m$ electrons and $q$ is the number of quadrilateral faces of $P$, then $P$ has $f(m) = \delta_{0,m-2} + 3(m-2) - q$ edges.

== See also ==
- Molecular geometry
- Tammes problem – Arrangement of points on the surface of a sphere so as to maximize the minimum distance between them

== Notes ==
- Whyte, L.L. (1952). "Unique arrangements of points on a sphere". Amer. Math. Monthly. 59 (9): 606–611. doi:10.2307/2306764. JSTOR 2306764.
- Cohn, Harvey (1956). "Stability configurations of electrons on a sphere". Math. Comput. 10 (55): 117–120. doi:10.1090/S0025-5718-1956-0081133-0.
- Goldberg, Michael (1969). "Stability configurations of electrons on a sphere". Math. Comp. 23 (108): 785–786. doi:10.1090/S0025-5718-69-99642-2.
- Erber, T.; Hockney, G. M. (1991). "equilibrium configurations of N equal charges on a sphere". J. Phys. A: Math. Gen. 24 (23): L1369. Bibcode:1991JPhA...24L1369E. doi:10.1088/0305-4470/24/23/008. S2CID 122561279.
- Morris, J. R.; Deaven, D. M.; Ho, K. M. (1996). "Genetic-algorithm energy minimization for point charges on a sphere". Phys. Rev. B. 53 (4): R1740–R1743. Bibcode:1996PhRvB..53.1740M. doi:10.1103/PhysRevB.53.R1740. PMID 9983695.
- Erber, T.; Hockney, G. M. (1997). "Complex Systems: Equilibrium Configurations of $N$ Equal Charges on a Sphere $(2\leq N\leq 112)$". Advances in Chemical Physics. Vol. 98. pp. 495–594. doi:10.1002/9780470141571.ch5. ISBN 978-0-470-14157-1..
- Altschuler, E. L.; Williams, T. J.; Ratner, E. R.; Tipton, R.; Stong, R.; Dowla, F.; Wooten, F. (1997). "Possible global minimum lattice configurations for Thomson's problem of charges on a sphere". Phys. Rev. Lett. 78 (14): 2681–2685. Bibcode:1997PhRvL..78.2681A. doi:10.1103/PhysRevLett.78.2681.
- Bowick, M.; Cacciuto, A.; Nelson, D. R.; Travesset, A. (2002). "Crystalline order on a sphere and the generalized Thomson Problem". Phys. Rev. Lett. 89 (18): 249902. arXiv:cond-mat/0206144. Bibcode:2002PhRvL..89r5502B. doi:10.1103/PhysRevLett.89.185502. PMID 12398614. S2CID 20362989.
- Dragnev, P. D.; Legg, D. A.; Townsend, D. W. (2002). "Discrete logarithmic energy on the sphere". Pacific J. Math. 207 (2): 345–358. doi:10.2140/pjm.2002.207.345..
- Katanforoush, A.; Shahshahani, M. (2003). "Distributing points on the sphere. I". Exper. Math. 12 (2): 199–209. doi:10.1080/10586458.2003.10504492. S2CID 7306812.
- Wales, David J.; Ulker, Sidika (2006). "Structure and dynamics of spherical crystals characterized for the Thomson problem". Phys. Rev. B. 74 (21) 212101. Bibcode:2006PhRvB..74u2101W. doi:10.1103/PhysRevB.74.212101. S2CID 119932997. Configurations reprinted in Wales, D. J.; Ulker, S. "The Cambridge cluster database".
- Slosar, A.; Podgornik, R. (2006). "On the connected-charges Thomson problem". Europhys. Lett. 75 (4): 631. arXiv:cond-mat/0606765. Bibcode:2006EL.....75..631S. doi:10.1209/epl/i2006-10146-1. S2CID 119005054.
- Cohn, Henry; Kumar, Abhinav (2007). "Universally optimal distribution of points on spheres". J. Amer. Math. Soc. 20 (1): 99–148. arXiv:math/0607446. Bibcode:2007JAMS...20...99C. doi:10.1090/S0894-0347-06-00546-7. S2CID 26614691.
- Wales, D. J.; McKay, H.; Altschuler, E. L. (2009). "Defect motifs for spherical topologies". Phys. Rev. B. 79 (22) 224115. Bibcode:2009PhRvB..79v4115W. doi:10.1103/PhysRevB.79.224115.. Configurations reproduced in Wales, D. J.; Ulker, S. "The Cambridge cluster database".
- Ridgway, W. J. M.; Cheviakov, A. F. (2018). "An iterative procedure for finding locally and globally optimal arrangements of particles on the unit sphere". Comput. Phys. Commun. 233: 84–109. Bibcode:2018CoPhC.233...84R. doi:10.1016/j.cpc.2018.03.029. S2CID 52097788.
- Cecka, Cris; Bowick, Mark J.; Middleton, Alan A. "Thomson Problem @ S.U." Archived from the original on 2018-04-09.
- This webpage contains many more electron configurations with the lowest known energy: https://www.hars.us.
