= Volume of an n-ball =

Size of a mathematical ball

Volumes of balls in dimensions 0 through 25; unit ball in red

In geometry, a ball is a region comprising all points within a fixed distance, called the radius, from a given point; that is, it is the region enclosed by a sphere or hypersphere. An n-ball is a ball in an n-dimensional Euclidean space. The volume of a n-ball is the Lebesgue measure of this ball, which generalizes to any dimension the usual volume of a ball in 3-dimensional space. The volume of a n-ball of radius R is $R^nV_n,$ where $V_n$ is the volume of the unit n-ball, the n-ball of radius 1.

The real number $V_n$ can be expressed via a two-dimension recurrence relation. Closed-form expressions involve the gamma, factorial, or double factorial function. The volume can also be expressed in terms of $A_n$, the area of the unit n-sphere.

== Formulas ==
The first volumes are as follows:

Dimension	Volume of a ball of radius R	Radius of a ball of volume V
0	$1$	(all 0-balls have volume 1)
1	$2R$	$\frac{V}{2}=0.5\times V$
2	$\pi R^2 \approx 3.142\times R^2$	$\frac{V^{1/2}}{\sqrt{\pi}}\approx 0.564\times V^{\frac{1}{2}}$
3	$\frac{4\pi}{3} R^3 \approx 4.189\times R^3$	$\left(\frac{3V}{4\pi}\right)^{1/3}\approx 0.620\times V^{1/3}$
4	$\frac{\pi^2}{2} R^4 \approx 4.935\times R^4$	$\frac{(2V)^{1/4}}{\sqrt{\pi}}\approx 0.671\times V^{1/4}$
5	$\frac{8\pi^2}{15} R^5\approx 5.264\times R^5$	$\left(\frac{15V}{8\pi^2}\right)^{1/5}\approx 0.717\times V^{1/5}$
6	$\frac{\pi^3}{6} R^6 \approx 5.168 \times R^6$	$\frac{(6V)^{1/6}}{\sqrt{\pi}}\approx 0.761\times V^{1/6}$
7	$\frac{16\pi^3}{105} R^7 \approx 4.725\times R^7$	$\left(\frac{105V}{16\pi^3}\right)^{1/7}\approx 0.801\times V^{1/7}$
8	$\frac{\pi^4}{24} R^8 \approx 4.059\times R^8$	$\frac{(24V)^{1/8}}{\sqrt{\pi}}\approx 0.839\times V^{1/8}$
9	$\frac{32\pi^4}{945} R^9 \approx 3.299\times R^9$	$\left(\frac{945V}{32\pi^4}\right)^{1/9}\approx 0.876\times V^{1/9}$
10	$\frac{\pi^5}{120} R^{10} \approx 2.550\times R^{10}$	$\frac{(120V)^{1/10}}{\sqrt{\pi}}\approx 0.911\times V^{1/10}$
11	$\frac{64\pi^5}{10395} R^{11} \approx 1.884\times R^{11}$	$\left(\frac{10395V}{64\pi^5}\right)^{1/11}\approx 0.944\times V^{1/11}$
12	$\frac{\pi^6}{720} R^{12} \approx 1.335\times R^{12}$	$\frac{(720V)^{1/12}}{\sqrt{\pi}}\approx 0.976\times V^{1/12}$
13	$\frac{128\pi^6}{135135} R^{13} \approx 0.911\times R^{13}$	$\left(\frac{135135V}{128\pi^6}\right)^{1/13}\approx 1.007\times V^{1/13}$
14	$\frac{\pi^7}{5040} R^{14} \approx 0.599\times R^{14}$	$\frac{(5040V)^{1/14}}{\sqrt{\pi}}\approx 1.037\times V^{1/14}$
15	$\frac{256\pi^7}{2027025} R^{15} \approx 0.381\times R^{15}$	$\left(\frac{2027025V}{256\pi^7}\right)^{1/15}\approx 1.066\times V^{1/15}$
n	V_{n}(R)	R_{n}(V)

=== Closed form ===
The n-dimensional volume of a Euclidean ball of radius R in n-dimensional Euclidean space is:
$$V_n(R) = \frac{\pi^{n/2}}{\Gamma\bigl(\tfrac n2 + 1\bigr)}R^n,$$
where Γ is Euler's gamma function. The gamma function is offset from but otherwise extends the factorial function to non-integer arguments. It satisfies $\Gamma(n) = (n-1)!$ if n is a positive integer and $\Gamma\bigl(n + \tfrac12\bigr) = \sqrt{\pi} \cdot \bigl(n - \tfrac12\bigr) \cdot \bigl(n - \tfrac32\bigr) \cdots \tfrac12$ if n is a non-negative integer.

=== Two-dimension recurrence relation ===
The volume can be computed without use of the Gamma function. As is proved below using a vector-calculus double integral in polar coordinates, the volume V of an n-ball of radius R can be expressed recursively in terms of the volume of an (n − 2)-ball, via the interleaved recurrence relation:
$$V_n(R) = \begin{cases}
1 &\text{if } n=0,\\[0.5ex]
2R &\text{if } n=1,\\[0.5ex]
\left(\dfrac{2\pi R^2}{n}\right) V_{n-2}(R) &\text{otherwise}.
\end{cases}$$
This allows computation of V_{n}(R) in approximately n / 2 steps.

=== Alternative forms ===
The volume can also be expressed in terms of an (n − 1)-ball using the one-dimension recurrence relation:
$$\begin{align}
V_0(R) &= 1, \\
V_n(R) &= \frac{\Gamma\bigl(\tfrac n2 + \tfrac12 \bigr)\sqrt\pi}{\Gamma\bigl(\tfrac n2 + 1\bigr)}R\, V_{n-1}(R).
\end{align}$$

Inverting the above, the radius of an n-ball of volume V can be expressed recursively in terms of the radius of an (n − 2)- or (n − 1)-ball:
$$\begin{align}
R_n(V) &= \bigl(\tfrac12n\bigr)^{1/n}\left(\Gamma\bigl(\tfrac n2\bigr) V\right)^{-2/(n(n-2))}R_{n-2}(V), \\
R_n(V) &= \frac{\Gamma\bigl(\tfrac n2 + 1\bigr)^{1/n}}{\Gamma\bigl(\tfrac n2 + \tfrac12 \bigr)^{1/(n-1)}}V^{-1/(n(n-1))}R_{n-1}(V).
\end{align}$$

Using explicit formulas for particular values of the gamma function at the integers and half-integers gives formulas for the volume of a Euclidean ball in terms of factorials. For non-negative integer k, these are:
$$\begin{align}
V_{2k}(R) &= \frac{\pi^k}{k!}R^{2k}, \\
V_{2k+1}(R) &= \frac{2(k!)(4\pi)^k}{(2k + 1)!}R^{2k+1}.
\end{align}$$

The volume can also be expressed in terms of double factorials. For a positive odd integer 2k + 1, the double factorial is defined by
$$(2k + 1)!! = (2k + 1) \cdot (2k - 1) \dotsm 5 \cdot 3 \cdot 1.$$
The volume of an odd-dimensional ball is
$$V_{2k+1}(R) = \frac{2(2\pi)^k}{(2k + 1)!!}R^{2k+1}.$$
There are multiple conventions for double factorials of even integers. Under the convention in which the double factorial satisfies
$$(2k)!! = (2k) \cdot (2k - 2) \dotsm 4 \cdot 2 \cdot {\textstyle \sqrt{2/\pi} } = 2^k \cdot k! \cdot {\textstyle \sqrt{2/\pi} },$$
the volume of an n-dimensional ball is, regardless of whether n is even or odd,
$$V_n(R) = \frac{2(2\pi)^{(n-1)/2}}{n!!}R^n.$$

If the convention $(2k)!! = (2k) \cdot (2k - 2) \dotsm 4 \cdot 2$ for double factorials is used, without the factor of $\textstyle \sqrt{2/\pi}$, then the volume of an n-dimensional ball is, regardless of whether n is even or odd,
$$V_n(R) = \frac{(\pi/2)^{\lfloor \frac{n}{2} \rfloor}(2R)^n}{n!!}.$$

Instead of expressing the volume V of the ball in terms of its radius R, the formulas can be inverted to express the radius as a function of the volume:
$$\begin{align}
R_n(V) &= \frac{\Gamma\bigl(\tfrac n2 + 1\bigr)^{1/n}}{\sqrt{\pi}}V^{1/n} \\
R_{2k}(V) &= \frac{(k!V)^{1/(2k)}}{\sqrt{\pi}}, \\
R_{2k+1}(V) &= \left(\frac{(2k+1)!V}{2(k!)(4\pi)^k}\right)^{1/(2k+1)}.\end{align}$$

=== Approximation for high dimensions ===
Stirling's approximation for the gamma function can be used to approximate the volume when the number of dimensions is high.
$$V_n(R) \sim \frac{1}{\sqrt{n\pi}}\left(\frac{2\pi e}{n}\right)^{n/2}R^n.$$
$$R_n(V) \sim (\pi n)^{1/(2n)}\sqrt{\frac{n}{2\pi e}} V^{1/n}.$$
In particular, for any fixed value of R the volume tends to a limiting value of 0 as n goes to infinity. Which value of n maximizes V_{n}(R) depends upon the value of R; for example, the volume V_{n}(1) is increasing for 0 ≤ n ≤ 5, achieves its maximum when n = 5, and is decreasing for n ≥ 5.

Also, there is an asymptotic formula for the surface area
$$\lim_{n \to \infty} \frac 1n \ln A_{n-1}(\sqrt n) = \frac 12 (\ln(2\pi) + 1)$$

=== Relation with surface area ===
Surface areas of hyperspheres in dimensions 0 through 25

Let A_{n − 1}(R) denote the hypervolume of the (n − 1)-sphere of radius R. The (n − 1)-sphere is the (n − 1)-dimensional boundary (surface) of the n-dimensional ball of radius R, and the sphere's hypervolume and the ball's hypervolume are related by:
$$A_{n-1}(R) = \frac{d}{dR} V_{n}(R) = \frac{n}{R}V_{n}(R).$$

Thus, A_{n − 1}(R) inherits formulas and recursion relationships from V_{n}(R), such as
$$A_{n-1}(R) = \frac{2\pi^{n/2}}{\Gamma\bigl(\tfrac n2\bigr)}R^{n-1}.$$
There are also formulas in terms of factorials and double factorials.

== Proofs ==
There are many proofs of the above formulas.

=== The volume is proportional to the nth power of the radius ===
An important step in several proofs about volumes of n-balls, and a generally useful fact besides, is that the volume of the n-ball of radius R is proportional to R^{n}:
$$V_n(R) \propto R^n.$$
The proportionality constant is the volume of the unit ball.

This is a special case of a general fact about volumes in n-dimensional space: If K is a body (measurable set) in that space and RK is the body obtained by stretching in all directions by the factor R then the volume of RK equals R^{n} times the volume of K. This is a direct consequence of the change of variables formula:
$$V(RK) = \int_{RK} dx = \int_K R^n\, dy = R^n V(K)$$
where dx = dx_{1}…dx_{n} and the substitution x = Ry was made.

Another proof of the above relation, which avoids multi-dimensional integration, uses induction: The base case is n = 0, where the proportionality is obvious. For the inductive step, assume that proportionality is true in dimension n − 1. Note that the intersection of an n-ball with a hyperplane is an (n − 1)-ball. When the volume of the n-ball is written as the integral of volumes of (n − 1)-balls:
$$V_n(R) = \int_{-R}^R V_{n-1}\!\left(\sqrt{R^2 - x^2}\right) dx,$$
it is possible by the inductive hypothesis to remove a factor of R from the radius of the (n − 1)-ball to get:
$$V_n(R) = R^{n-1}\! \int_{-R}^R V_{n-1}\!\left(\sqrt{1 - \left(\frac{x}{R}\right)^2}\right) dx.$$
Making the change of variables t = x/R leads to:
$$V_n(R) = R^n\! \int_{-1}^1 V_{n-1}\!\left(\sqrt{1 - t^2}\right) dt = R^n V_n(1),$$
which demonstrates the proportionality relation in dimension n. By induction, the proportionality relation is true in all dimensions.

=== The two-dimension recursion formula ===
A proof of the recursion formula relating the volume of the n-ball and an (n − 2)-ball can be given using the proportionality formula above and integration in cylindrical coordinates. Fix a plane through the center of the ball. Let r denote the distance between a point in the plane and the center of the sphere, and let θ denote the azimuth. Intersecting the n-ball with the (n − 2)-dimensional plane defined by fixing a radius and an azimuth gives an (n − 2)-ball of radius $\textstyle \sqrt{R^2 - r^2}$. The volume of the ball can therefore be written as an iterated integral of the volumes of the (n − 2)-balls over the possible radii and azimuths:
$$V_n(R) = \int_0^{2\pi} \int_0^R V_{n-2}\!\left(\sqrt{R^2 - r^2}\right) r\,dr\,d\theta,$$
The azimuthal coordinate can be immediately integrated out. Applying the proportionality relation shows that the volume equals
$$V_n(R) = 2\pi V_{n-2}(R) \int_0^R \left(1 - \left(\frac{r}{R}\right)^2\right)^{(n-2)/2}\,r\,dr.$$
The integral can be evaluated by making the substitution u = 1 − (r/R)^{2} to get
$$\begin{align}
V_n(R) &= 2\pi V_{n-2}(R) \cdot \left[-\frac{R^2}{n}\left(1 - \left(\frac{r}{R}\right)^2\right)^{n/2}\right]_{r=0}^{r=R} \\
&= \frac{2\pi R^2}{n} V_{n-2}(R),
\end{align}$$
which is the two-dimension recursion formula.

The same technique can be used to give an inductive proof of the volume formula. The base cases of the induction are the 0-ball and the 1-ball, which can be checked directly using the facts $\Gamma(1) = 1$ and $\Gamma\bigl(\tfrac32\bigr) = \tfrac12 \cdot \Gamma\bigl(\tfrac12\bigr) = \tfrac\sqrt\pi2$. The inductive step is similar to the above, but instead of applying proportionality to the volumes of the (n − 2)-balls, the inductive hypothesis is applied instead.

=== The one-dimension recursion formula ===
The proportionality relation can also be used to prove the recursion formula relating the volumes of an n-ball and an (n − 1)-ball. As in the proof of the proportionality formula, the volume of an n-ball can be written as an integral over the volumes of (n − 1)-balls. Instead of making a substitution, however, the proportionality relation can be applied to the volumes of the (n − 1)-balls in the integrand:
$$V_n(R) = V_{n-1}(R) \int_{-R}^R \left(1 - \left(\frac{x}{R}\right)^2\right)^{(n-1)/2} \,dx.$$
The integrand is an even function, so by symmetry the interval of integration can be restricted to [0, R]. On the interval [0, R], it is possible to apply the substitution u = (x/R)^{2}. This transforms the expression into
$$V_{n-1}(R) \cdot R \cdot \int_0^1 (1-u)^{(n-1)/2}u^{-\frac12}\,du$$
The integral is a value of a well-known special function called the beta function Β(x, y), and the volume in terms of the beta function is
$$V_n(R) = V_{n-1}(R) \cdot R \cdot \Beta\left(\tfrac{n + 1}2, \tfrac12\right).$$
The beta function can be expressed in terms of the gamma function in much the same way that factorials are related to binomial coefficients. Applying this relationship gives
$$V_n(R) = V_{n-1}(R) \cdot R \cdot \frac{\Gamma\bigl(\tfrac n2 + \tfrac12 \bigr)\Gamma\bigl(\tfrac12\bigr)}{\Gamma\bigl(\tfrac n2 + 1\bigr)}.$$
Using the value $\Gamma\bigl(\tfrac12\bigr) = \sqrt{\pi}$ gives the one-dimension recursion formula:
$$V_n(R) = R\sqrt{\pi}\frac{\Gamma\bigl(\tfrac n2 + \tfrac12\bigr)}{\Gamma\bigl(\tfrac n2 + 1\bigr)} V_{n-1}(R).$$

As with the two-dimension recursive formula, the same technique can be used to give an inductive proof of the volume formula.

=== Direct integration in spherical coordinates ===
The volume of the n-ball $V_n(R)$ can be computed by integrating the volume element in spherical coordinates. The spherical coordinate system has a radial coordinate r and angular coordinates φ_{1}, …, φ_{n − 1}, where the domain of each φ except φ_{n − 1} is [0, π), and the domain of φ_{n − 1} is [0, 2π). The spherical volume element is:
$$dV = r^{n-1}\sin^{n-2}(\varphi_1)\sin^{n-3}(\varphi_2) \cdots \sin(\varphi_{n-2})\,dr\,d\varphi_1\,d\varphi_2 \cdots d\varphi_{n-1},$$
and the volume is the integral of this quantity over r between 0 and R and all possible angles:
$$V_n(R) = \int_0^R \int_0^\pi \cdots \int_0^{2\pi} r^{n-1}\sin^{n-2}(\varphi_1) \cdots \sin(\varphi_{n-2})\,d\varphi_{n-1} \cdots d\varphi_1\,dr.$$
Each of the factors in the integrand depends on only a single variable, and therefore the iterated integral can be written as a product of integrals:
$$V_n(R) = \left(\int_0^R r^{n-1}\,dr\right)\!\left(\int_0^\pi \sin^{n-2}(\varphi_1)\,d\varphi_1\right)\cdots\left(\int_0^{2\pi} d\varphi_{n-1}\right).$$
The integral over the radius is R^{n}/n. The intervals of integration on the angular coordinates can, by the symmetry of the sine about π/2, be changed to [0, π/2]:
$$V_n(R) = \frac{R^n}{n} \left(2\int_0^{\pi/2} \sin^{n-2}(\varphi_1)\,d\varphi_1\right) \cdots \left(4\int_0^{\pi/2} d\varphi_{n-1}\right).$$
Each of the remaining integrals is now a particular value of the beta function:
$$V_n(R) = \frac{R^n}{n} \Beta\bigl(\tfrac{n-1}2, \tfrac12\bigr) \Beta\bigl(\tfrac{n-2}2, \tfrac12\bigr) \cdots \Beta\bigl(1, \tfrac12\bigr) \cdot 2\,\Beta\bigl(\tfrac12, \tfrac12\bigr).$$

The beta functions can be rewritten in terms of gamma functions:

$$V_n(R) = \frac{R^n}{n} \cdot \frac{\Gamma\bigl(\tfrac n2 - \tfrac12\bigr)\Gamma\bigl(\tfrac12\bigr)}{\Gamma\bigl(\tfrac n2\bigr)} \cdot \frac{\Gamma\bigl(\tfrac n2 - 1\bigr)\Gamma\bigl(\tfrac12\bigr)}{\Gamma\bigl(\tfrac n2 - \tfrac12\bigr)} \cdots \frac{\Gamma(1)\Gamma\bigl(\tfrac12\bigr)}{\Gamma\bigl(\tfrac32\bigr)} \cdot 2 \frac{\Gamma\bigl(\tfrac12\bigr)\Gamma\bigl(\tfrac12\bigr)}{\Gamma(1)}.$$

This product telescopes. Combining this with the values $\Gamma\bigl(\tfrac12\bigr) = \sqrt{\pi}$ and $\Gamma(1) = 1$ and the functional equation $z\Gamma(z) = \Gamma(z+1)$ leads to

$$V_n(R) = \frac{2\pi^{n/2}R^n}{n\,\Gamma\bigl(\tfrac n2\bigr)} = \frac{\pi^{n/2}R^n}{\Gamma\bigl(\tfrac n2 + 1\bigr)}.$$

=== Gaussian integrals ===
The volume formula can be proven directly using Gaussian integrals. Consider the function:
$$f(x_1, \ldots, x_n) = {\exp}\biggl({-\tfrac12 \sum_{i=1}^n x_i^2}\biggr).$$
This function is both rotationally invariant and a product of functions of one variable each. Using the fact that it is a product and the formula for the Gaussian integral gives:
$$\int_{\mathbf{R}^n} f \,dV = \prod_{i=1}^n \left(\int_{-\infty}^\infty \exp\left(-\tfrac12 x_i^2\right)\,dx_i\right) = (2\pi)^{n/2},$$
where dV is the n-dimensional volume element. Using rotational invariance, the same integral can be computed in spherical coordinates:
$$\int_{\mathbf{R}^n} f \,dV = \int_0^\infty \int_{S^{n-1}(r)} \exp\left(-\tfrac12 r^2\right) \,dA\,dr,$$
where S^{n − 1}(r) is an (n − 1)-sphere of radius r (being the surface of an n-ball of radius r) and dA is the area element (equivalently, the (n − 1)-dimensional volume element). The surface area of the sphere satisfies a proportionality equation similar to the one for the volume of a ball: If A_{n − 1}(r) is the surface area of an (n − 1)-sphere of radius r, then:
$$A_{n-1}(r) = r^{n-1} A_{n-1}(1).$$
Applying this to the above integral gives the expression
$$(2\pi)^{n/2} = \int_0^\infty \int_{S^{n-1}(r)} \exp\left(-\tfrac12 r^2\right) \,dA\,dr  =  A_{n-1}(1) \int_0^\infty \exp\left(-\tfrac12 r^2\right)\,r^{n-1}\,dr.$$
Substituting t = r^{2}/2:
$$\int_0^\infty \exp\left(-\tfrac12 r^2\right)\,r^{n-1}\,dr  =  2^{(n-2)/2} \int_0^\infty e^{-t} t^{(n-2)/2}\,dt.$$
The integral on the right is the gamma function evaluated at n/2.

Combining the two results shows that
$$A_{n-1}(1) = \frac{2\pi^{n/2}}{\Gamma\bigl(\tfrac n2\bigr)}.$$
To derive the volume of an n-ball of radius R from this formula, integrate the surface area of a sphere of radius r for 0 ≤ r ≤ R and apply the functional equation zΓ(z) = Γ(z + 1):
$$V_n(R) = \int_0^R \frac{2\pi^{n/2}}{\Gamma\bigl(\tfrac n2\bigr)} \,r^{n-1}\,dr = \frac{2\pi^{n/2}}{n\,\Gamma\bigl(\tfrac n2\bigr)}R^n = \frac{\pi^{n/2}}{\Gamma\bigl(\tfrac n2 + 1\bigr)}R^n.$$

=== Geometric proof ===
The relations $V_{n+1}(R) = \tfrac{R}{n+1}A_n(R)$ and $A_{n+1}(R) = (2\pi R)V_n(R)$ and thus the volumes of n-balls and areas of n-spheres can also be derived geometrically. As noted above, because a ball of radius $R$ is obtained from a unit ball $B_n$ by rescaling all directions in $R$ times, $V_n(R)$ is proportional to $\textstyle R^n$, which implies that $\tfrac{d}{dR}V_n(R) = \tfrac{n}{R} V_n(R)$. Also, $A_{n-1}(R) = \tfrac{d}{dR}V_n(R)$, since a ball is a union of concentric spheres and increasing the radius by ε sweeps out a shell of thickness ε. Thus, $V_{n}(R) = \tfrac{R}{n}A_{n-1}(R)$.

Furthermore, $A_{n+1}(R) = (2\pi R)V_n(R)$, since a volume-preserving bijection between the unit sphere ($S_{n+1}$) and $S_1 \times B_n$ exists:
$$(x,y,\vec{z}) \mapsto \left(\frac{x}{\sqrt{x^2+y^2}},\frac{y}{\sqrt{x^2+y^2}},\vec{z}\right)$$
($\vec{z}$ is an n-tuple; $\vert (x,y,\vec{z})\vert =1$; we are ignoring sets of measure 0). Volume is preserved because at each point; the difference from isometry is a stretching in the xy plane (by $1/\!\sqrt{x^2+y^2}$ times in the direction of constant $\textstyle x^2+y^2$) that exactly matches the compression in the direction of the gradient of $|\vec{z}|$ on $S_n$ (with the relevant angles being equal). For $S_2$, a similar argument was originally made by Archimedes in On the Sphere and Cylinder.

== Balls in L^{p} norms ==
There are also explicit expressions for the volumes of balls in L^{p} norms. The L^{p} norm of the vector x = (x_{1}, …, x_{n}) in R^{n} is
$$\|x\|_p = \biggl(\sum_{i=1}^n | x_i |^p \biggr)^{\! 1/p},$$
and an L^{p} ball is the set of all vectors whose L^{p} norm is less than or equal to a fixed number called the radius of the ball. The case p = 2 is the standard Euclidean distance function, but other values of p occur in diverse contexts such as information theory, coding theory, and dimensional regularization.

The volume of an L^{p} ball of radius R is

$$V^p_n(R) = \frac{\Bigl(2\,\Gamma\bigl(\tfrac1p + 1\bigr)\Bigr)^n}{\Gamma\bigl(\tfrac np + 1\bigr)}R^n.$$

These volumes satisfy recurrence relations similar to those for p = 2:

$$V^p_n(R) = \frac{\Bigl(2\,\Gamma\bigl(\tfrac1p + 1\bigr)\Bigr)^p p}{n} R^p \, V^p_{n-p}(R)$$

and

$$V^p_n(R) = 2 \frac{\Gamma\bigl(\tfrac1p + 1\bigr)\Gamma\bigl(\tfrac{n-1}p + 1\bigr)}{\Gamma\bigl(\tfrac np + 1\bigr)} R \, V^p_{n-1}(R),$$

which can be written more concisely using a generalized binomial coefficient,

$$V^p_n(R) =  \frac{2}{\dbinom{n/p}{1/p}} R \, V^p_{n-1}(R).$$

For p = 2, one recovers the recurrence for the volume of a Euclidean ball because 2Γ(3/2) = √π.

For example, in the cases p = 1 (taxicab norm) and p = ∞ (max norm), the volumes are:
$$\begin{align} V^1_n(R) &= \frac{2^n}{n!}R^n, \\ V^\infty_n(R) &= 2^n R^n. \end{align}$$
These agree with elementary calculations of the volumes of cross-polytopes and hypercubes.

=== Relation with surface area ===
For most values of p, the surface area $A_{n-1}^p(R)$ of an L^{p} sphere of radius R (the boundary of an L^{p} n-ball of radius R) cannot be calculated by differentiating the volume of an L^{p} ball with respect to its radius. While the volume can be expressed as an integral over the surface areas using the coarea formula, the coarea formula contains a correction factor that accounts for how the p-norm varies from point to point. For p = 2 and p = ∞, this factor is one. However, if p = 1 then the correction factor is $\sqrt{n}$}: the surface area of an L^{1} sphere of radius R in R^{n} is $\sqrt{n}$ times the derivative of the volume of an L^{1} ball. This can be seen most simply by applying the divergence theorem to the vector field F(x) = x to get

$nV^1_n(R) =$$\iiint_V\left(\mathbf{\nabla}\cdot\mathbf{F}\right)\,dV=$ $\scriptstyle S$ $(\mathbf{F}\cdot\mathbf{n})\,dS$
$\phantom{nV^1_n(R)}\vphantom{\Biggl(} =$ $\scriptstyle S$ $\frac{1}{\sqrt{n}}(\vert x_1\vert +\cdots+\vert x_n\vert )\,dS$ $= \frac{R}{\sqrt{n}}$ $\scriptstyle S$ $\,dS$
$\phantom{nV^1_n(R)}\vphantom{\Biggl(} = \frac{R}{\sqrt{n}} A^1_{n-1}(R).$

For other values of p, the constant is a complicated integral.

=== Generalizations ===
The volume formula can be generalized even further. For positive real numbers p_{1}, …, p_{n}, define the (p_{1}, …, p_{n}) ball with limit L ≥ 0 to be
$$B_{p_1, \ldots, p_n}(L) = \left\{ x = (x_1, \ldots, x_n) \in \mathbf{R}^n : \vert x_1 \vert^{p_1} + \cdots + \vert x_n \vert^{p_n} \le L \right\}.$$
The volume of this ball has been known since the time of Dirichlet:
$$V\bigl(B_{p_1, \ldots, p_n}(L)\bigr) = \frac{2^n \Gamma\bigl(\tfrac1{p_1} + 1\bigr) \cdots \Gamma\bigl(\tfrac1{p_n} + 1\bigr)}{\Gamma\bigl(\tfrac1{p_1} + \cdots + \tfrac1{p_n} + 1\bigr)} L^{\tfrac1{p_1} + \cdots + \tfrac1{p_n}}.$$

==== Comparison to L^{p} norm ====
Using the harmonic mean $p = \frac{n}{\frac{1}{p_1} + \cdots \frac{1}{p_n}}$ and defining $R = \sqrt[p]{L}$, the similarity to the volume formula for the L^{p} ball becomes clear.
$$V\left(\left\{ x \in \mathbf{R}^n : \sqrt[p]{\vert x_1 \vert^{p_1} + \cdots + \vert x_n \vert^{p_n}} \le R \right\}\right) = \frac{2^n \Gamma\bigl(\tfrac1{p_1} + 1\bigr) \cdots \Gamma\bigl(\tfrac1{p_n} + 1\bigr)}{\Gamma\bigl(\tfrac{n}{p} + 1\bigr)} R^n.$$

== See also ==
- n-sphere
- Sphere packing
- Hamming bound
