= Tammes problem =

Circle-packing on the surface of a sphere

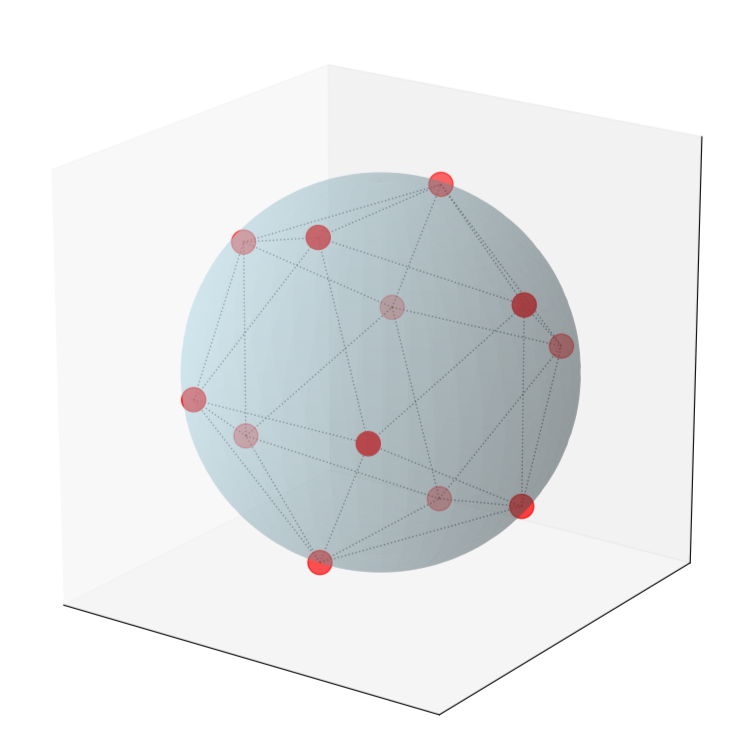
12 points in an optimal arrangement around a sphere, which also are the vertices of a regular icosahedron.

In geometry, the Tammes problem is a problem in packing a given number of points on the surface of a sphere such that the minimum distance between points is maximized. It is named after the Dutch botanist Pieter Merkus Lambertus Tammes (the nephew of pioneering botanist Jantina Tammes) who posed the problem in his 1930 doctoral dissertation on the distribution of pores on pollen grains. If circles with diameter equal to the minimum distance are drawn around each point, they will not cross. Another equivalent way of phrasing the problem is to ask for the largest radius such that the given number of circles of that radius can be packed disjointly on the sphere.

Unsolved problem in mathematics
What is the optimal packing of circles on the surface of a sphere for every possible amount of circles?
More unsolved problems in mathematics

It can be viewed as a particular special case of the generalized Thomson problem of minimizing the total Coulomb energy of electrons in a spherical arrangement. Thus far, solutions have been proven only for small numbers of circles: 3 through 14, and 24. There are conjectured solutions for many other cases, including those in higher dimensions.

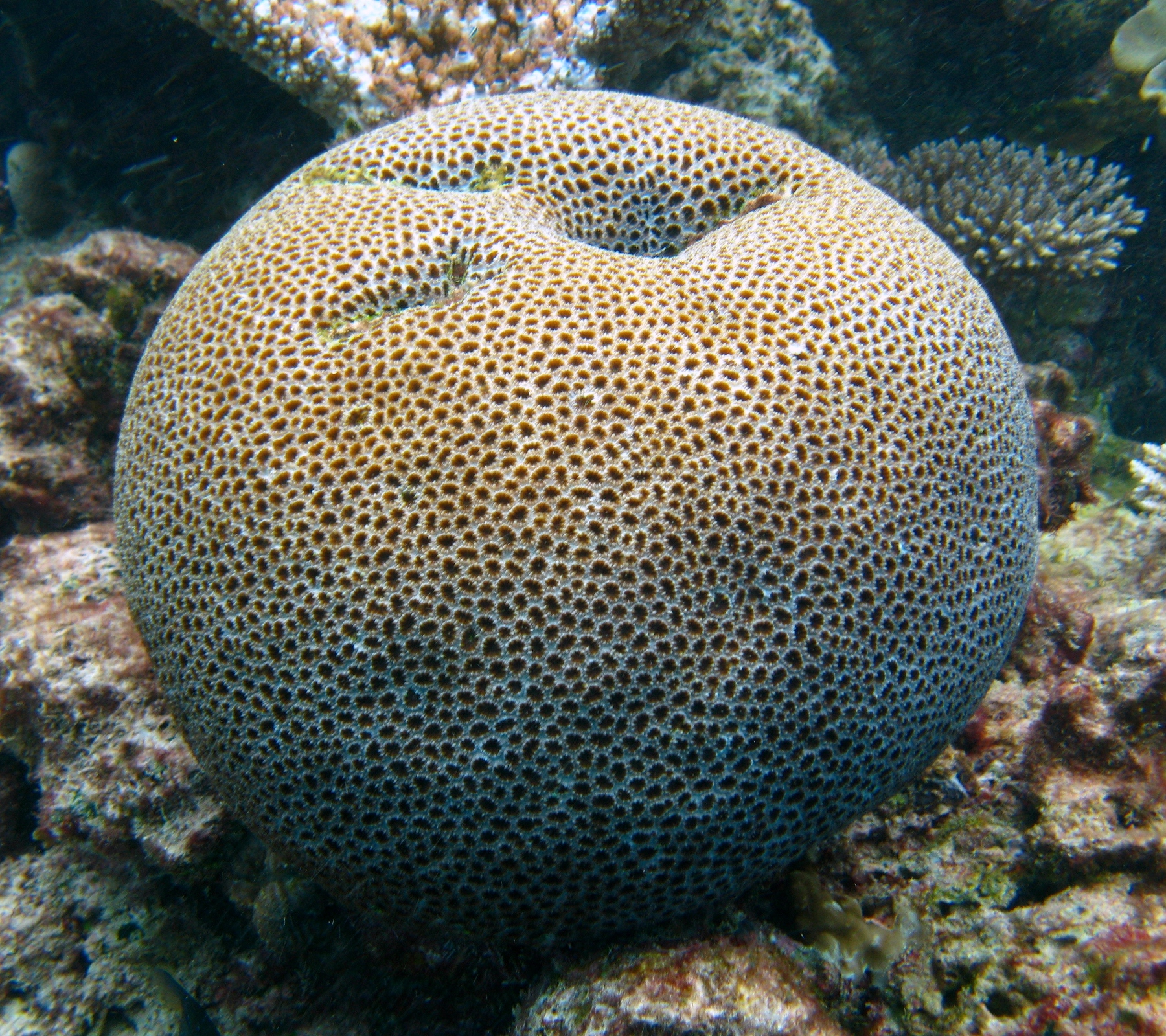
Some natural systems such as this coral require approximate solutions to problems similar to the Tammes problem

== See also ==
- Spherical code
- Kissing number problem
- Cylinder sphere packings
