= Image-based lighting =

3D rendering technique

Image-based lighting (IBL) is a 3D rendering technique which involves capturing an omnidirectional representation of real-world light information as an image, typically using a 360° camera. This image is then projected onto a dome or sphere analogously to environment mapping, and this is used to simulate the lighting for the objects in the scene. This allows highly detailed real-world lighting to be used to light a scene, instead of trying to accurately model illumination using an existing rendering technique.

Image-based lighting often uses high-dynamic-range imaging for greater realism, though this is not universal.

According to Fxguide, "Almost all modern rendering software offers some type of image-based lighting, though the exact terminology used in the system may vary."

Motion picture production makes use of image-based lighting, and it can be seen in movies like Monsters University, The Great Gatsby, and Iron Man 2.

One reference capture technique, sometimes referred to as "wickmania" by camera technicians and VFX supervisors, involves shooting footage of two small spheres (one matte, one of a light-reflective material) on a physical set. This is used when the IBL will be later applied to an animated object or character that interacts with live objects or characters under the same lighting conditions.

Image-based lighting is also used in some video games as video game consoles and personal computers start to have the computational resources to render scenes in real time using this technique. This technique is used in:

- Forza Motorsport 4
- Rise of the Tomb Raider
- Into the Stars
- SuperTuxKart

Image-based lighting is also a built-in feature of the Crytek CryEngine video game engine.

== See also ==
- Ambient occlusion
- Cube mapping
- Relighting
