= HTM =

HTM may refer to:

== Computing ==
- .htm or .html, file extension for HTML
- Hierarchical temporal memory, a machine learning mode
- Hierarchical triangular mesh, a compact spherical location encoding method

== Other uses ==
- Held to maturity, an accounting term
- HTM Personenvervoer, The Hague, Netherlands, public transport company
- Khatgal Airport, Mongolia, IATA code
