= Hierarchical triangular mesh =

Data structure for storing geometric information

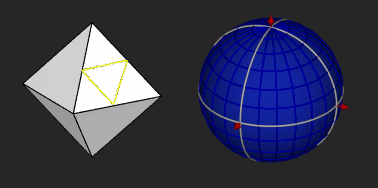
Diagram of Hierarchical Triangular Mesh (HTM). The spherical polygons are the projection of the edges of the octahedron onto the circumscribing sphere.

Hierarchical Triangular Mesh (HTM) is a kind of quad tree based on subdivision of a distorted octahedron, used for mesh generation in 3-D computer graphics and geometric data structures.

== Functions ==
- It provides a systematic indexing method for objects localized on a sphere.
- It is an efficient method for searching different resolutions like arc seconds or hemispheres.
- It can be used as a method to subdivide the spherical surface into triangles of nearly equal shape and size.

== See also ==
- HEALPix
- Quadrilateralized spherical cube
- Geodesic grid
