= Quadrilateralized spherical cube =

Polyhedral equal-area map projection

Development of the quadrilateralized spherical cube projection on an Earth model

In mapmaking, a quadrilateralized spherical cube, or quad sphere for short, is an equal-area polyhedral map projection and discrete global grid scheme for data collected on a spherical surface (either that of the Earth or the celestial sphere). It was first proposed in 1975 by Chan and O'Neill for the Naval Environmental Prediction Research Facility. This scheme is also often called the COBE sky cube, because it was designed to hold data from the Cosmic Background Explorer (COBE) project.

== Elements ==
The quad sphere has two principal characteristic features. The first is that the mapping consists of projecting the sphere onto the faces of an inscribed cube using a curvilinear projection that preserves area. The sphere is divided into six equal regions, which correspond to the faces of the cube. The vertices of the cube correspond to the cartesian coordinates defined by |x|=|y|=|z| on a sphere centred at the origin. For an Earth projection, the cube is usually oriented with one face normal to the North Pole and one face centered on the Greenwich meridian (although any definition of pole and meridian could be used). The faces of the cube are divided into a grid of square bins, where the number of bins along each edge is a power of 2, selected to produce the desired bin size. Thus the number of bins on each face is 2^{2N}, where N is the binning depth, for a total of 6 × 2^{2N}. For example, a binning depth of 10 gives 1024 × 1024 bins on each face or 6291456 (6 × 2^{20}) in all, each bin covering an area of 23.6 square arcminutes (2.00 microsteradians).

The second key feature is that the bins are numbered serially, rather than being rastered as for an image. The total number of bits required for the bin numbers at level N is 2N + 3, where the three most significant bits are used for the face numbers and the remaining bits are used to number the bins within each face. The faces are numbered from 0 to 5: 0 for the north face, 1 through 4 for the equatorial faces (1 being on the meridian), and 5 for the south. Thus at a binning depth of 10, face 0 has bin numbers 0–1,048,575, face 1 has numbers 1,048,576–2,097,151, and so on. Within each face the bins are numbered serially from one corner (the convention is to start at the "lower left") to the opposite corner, ordered in such a way that each pair of bits corresponds to a level of bin resolution. This ordering is in effect a two-dimensional binary tree, which is referred to as the quad-tree. The conversion between bin numbers and coordinates is straightforward. If four-byte integers are used for the bin numbers the maximum practical depth, which uses 31 of the 32 bits, results in a bin size of 0.0922 square arcminutes (7.80 nanosteradians).

In principle, the mapping and numbering schemes are separable: the map projection onto the cube could be used with another bin-numbering scheme, and the numbering scheme itself could be used with any arrangement of bins susceptible to partitioning into a set of square arrays. Used together, they make a flexible and efficient system for storing map data.

== Advantages ==
The quad sphere projection does not produce singularities at the poles or elsewhere, as do some other equal-area mapping schemes. Distortion is moderate over the entire sphere, so that at no point are shapes altered beyond recognition.

== Related projections ==
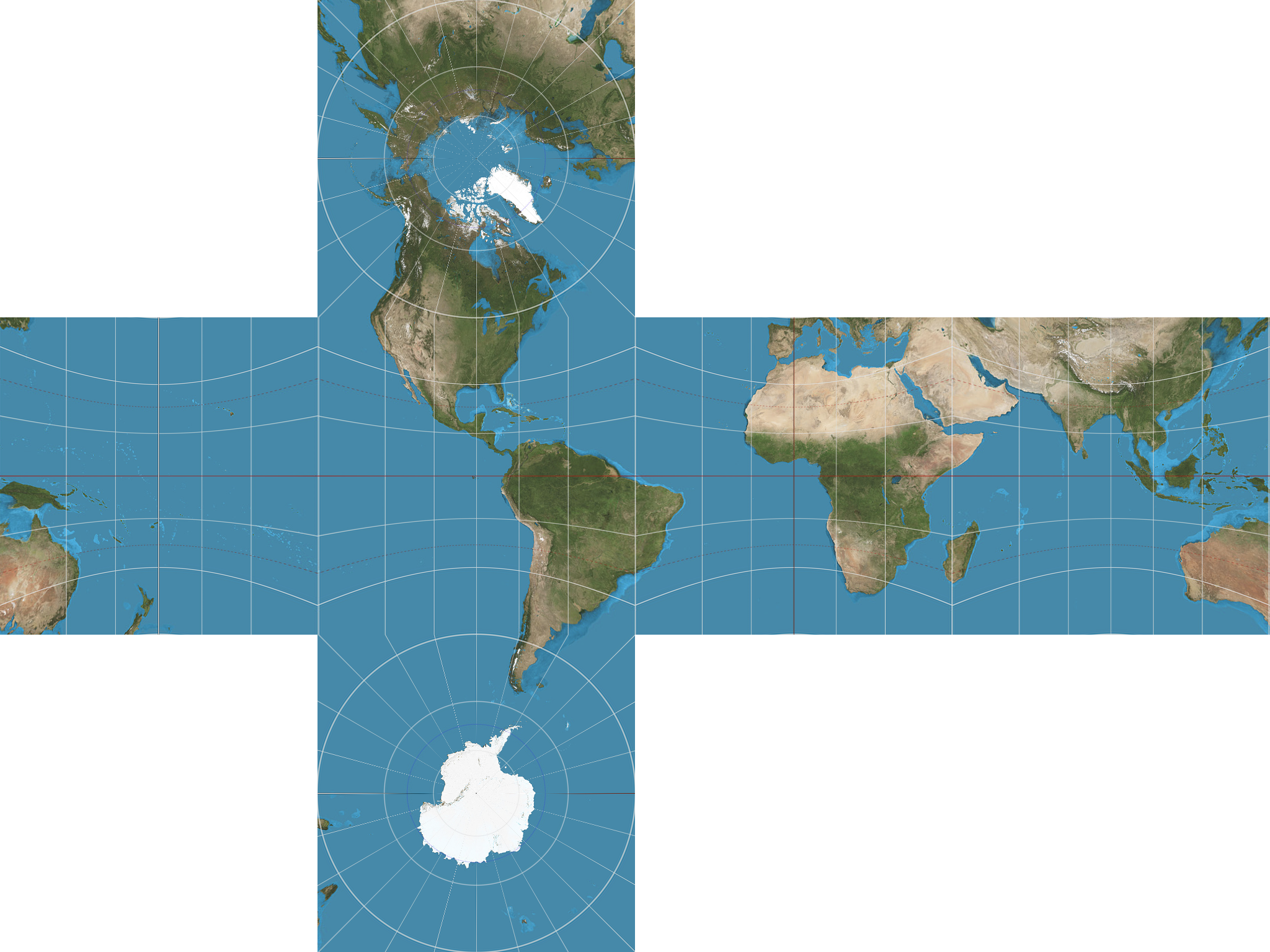
A cube map projection of the Earth, similar to QSC but not equal-area

There are some related projections:

- rHEALPix: is a cubic configuration in the HEALPix framework (of 2003), elaborated in 2016.
- S2 projection was created at Google (published in 2016 with a first pre-release in 2019) for the purpose of defining a discrete global grid scheme. It is similar to the quad sphere but is not equal-area.

== See also ==
- List of map projections
- Cube mapping
- Geodesic grid
