= Gyroelongated square cupola =

23rd Johnson solid (26 faces)

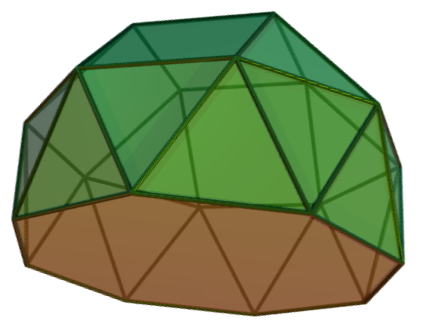
- Type: Johnson; J_{22} – J_{23} – J_{24}
- Faces: 3×4+8 triangles 1+4 squares 1 octagon
- Edges: 44
- Vertices: 20
- Vertex configuration: 4(3.4^{3}); 2.4(3^{3}.8); 8(3^{4}.4)
- Symmetry group: C_{4v}
- Dual polyhedron: -
- Properties: convex

In geometry, the gyroelongated square cupola is one of the Johnson solids (J_{23}). As the name suggests, it can be constructed by gyroelongating a square cupola (J_{4}) by attaching an octagonal antiprism to its base. It can also be seen as a gyroelongated square bicupola (J_{45}) with one square bicupola removed.

A Johnson solid is one of 92 strictly convex polyhedra that are composed of regular polygon faces but are not uniform polyhedra (that is, they are not Platonic solids, Archimedean solids, prisms, or antiprisms). They were named by Norman Johnson, who first listed these polyhedra in 1966.

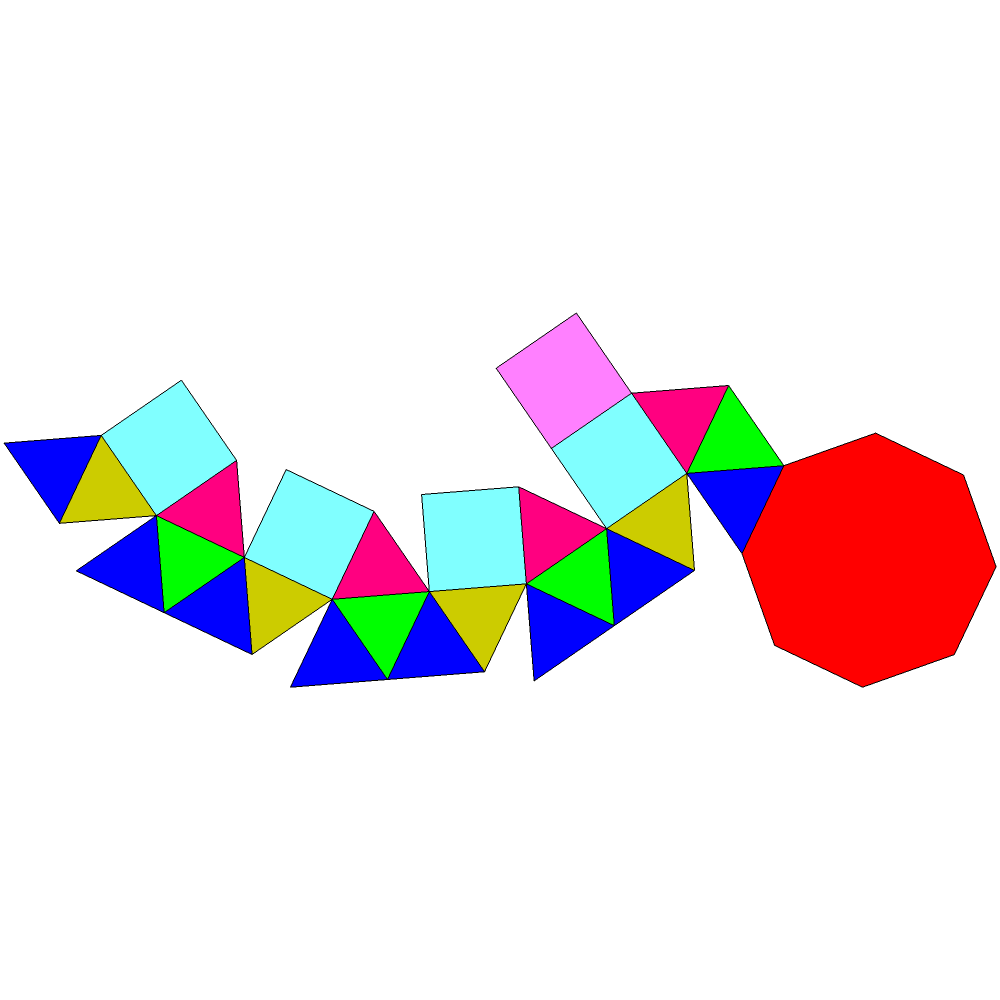
An unfolded gyroelongated square cupola, faces colored by symmetry

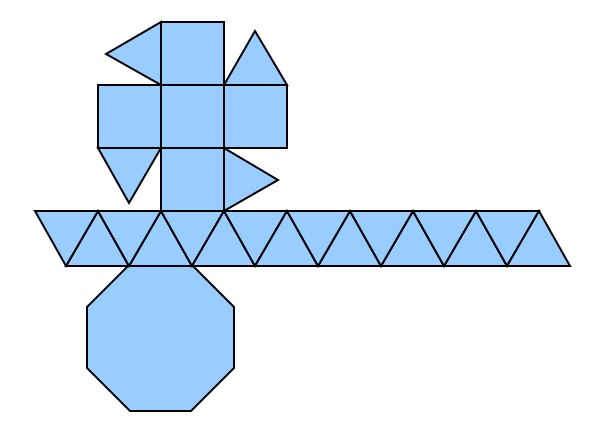
An unfolded gyroelongated square cupola

3D model of a gyroelongated square cupola

== Area and volume ==
The surface area is

$$A=\left(7+2\sqrt{2}+5\sqrt{3}\right)a^2\approx 18.4886811...a^2.$$

The volume is the sum of the volume of a square cupola and the volume of an octagonal prism,

$V=\left(1+\frac{2}{3}\sqrt{2} + \frac{2}{3}\sqrt{4+2\sqrt{2}+2\sqrt{146+103\sqrt{2}}}\right)a^3$ $\approx6.2107658...a^3.$

== Dual polyhedron ==
The dual of the gyroelongated square cupola has 20 faces: 8 kites, 4 rhombi, and 8 pentagons.

Dual gyroelongated square cupola	Net of dual
