= Hebesphenomegacorona =

89th Johnson solid (21 faces)

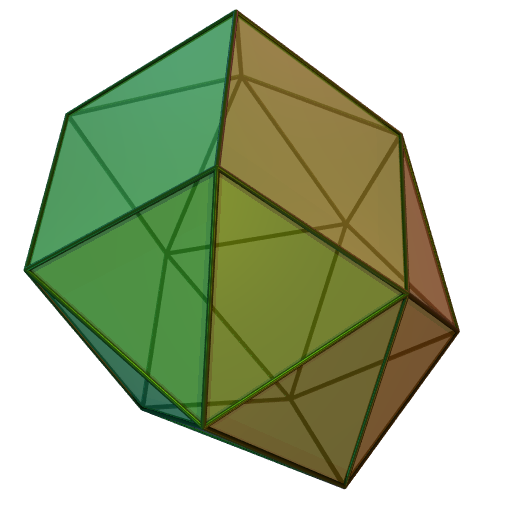
- Type: Johnson; J_{88} – J_{89} – J_{90}
- Faces: 3×2+3×4 triangles 1+2 squares
- Edges: 33
- Vertices: 14
- Vertex configuration: 4(3^{2}.4^{2}); 2+2×2(3^{5}); 4(3^{4}.4)
- Symmetry group: C_{2v}
- Properties: convex, elementary

Net
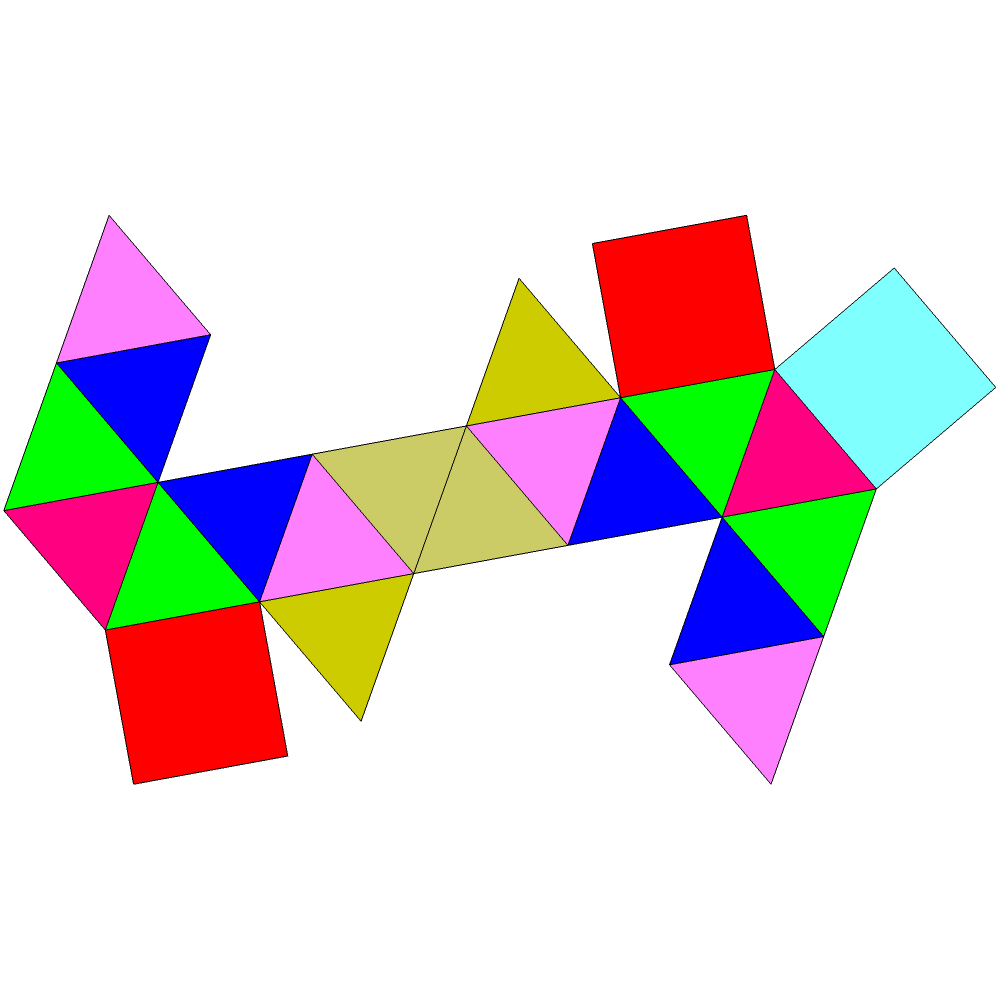

3D model of a hebesphenomegacorona

In geometry, the hebesphenomegacorona is a Johnson solid with 18 equilateral triangles and 3 squares as its faces.

== Properties ==
The hebesphenomegacorona is named by Johnson (1966) in which he used the prefix hebespheno- referring to a blunt wedge-like complex formed by three adjacent lunes—a square with equilateral triangles attached on its opposite sides. The suffix -megacorona refers to a crownlike complex of 12 triangles. By joining both complexes together, the result polyhedron has 18 equilateral triangles and 3 squares, making 21 faces. All of its faces are regular polygons, categorizing the hebesphenomegacorona as a Johnson solid—a convex polyhedron in which all of its faces are regular polygons—enumerated as 89th Johnson solid $J_{89}$. It is an elementary polyhedron, meaning it cannot be separated by a plane into two small regular-faced polyhedra.

The surface area of a hebesphenomegacorona with edge length $a$ can be determined by adding the area of its faces, 18 equilateral triangles and 3 squares
$$\frac{6 + 9\sqrt{3}}{2}a^2 \approx 10.7942a^2,$$
and its volume is $2.9129a^3$.

== Cartesian coordinates ==
Let $a \approx 0.21684$ be the second smallest positive root of the polynomial
$$\begin{align} &26880x^{10} + 35328x^9 - 25600x^8 - 39680x^7 + 6112x^6 \\ &\quad {}+ 13696x^5 + 2128x^4 - 1808x^3 - 1119x^2 + 494x - 47 \end{align}$$
Then, Cartesian coordinates of a hebesphenomegacorona with edge length 2 are given by the union of the orbits of the points

- $\left(1,1,2\sqrt{1-a^2}\right)$,
- $\left(1+2a,1,0\right)$,
- $\left(0,1+\sqrt{2}\sqrt{\frac{2a-1}{a-1}},-\frac{2a^2+a-1}{\sqrt{1-a^2}}\right)$,
- $\left(1,0,-\sqrt{3-4a^2}\right)$,
- $\left(0,\frac{\sqrt{2(3-4a^2)(1-2a)}+\sqrt{1+a}}{2(1-a)\sqrt{1+a}},\frac{(2a-1)\sqrt{3-4a^2}}{2(1-a)}-\frac{\sqrt{2(1-2a)}}{2(1-a)\sqrt{1+a}}\right)$

under the action of the group generated by reflections about the xz-plane and the yz-plane.
