= Augmented sphenocorona =

87th Johnson solid (17 faces)

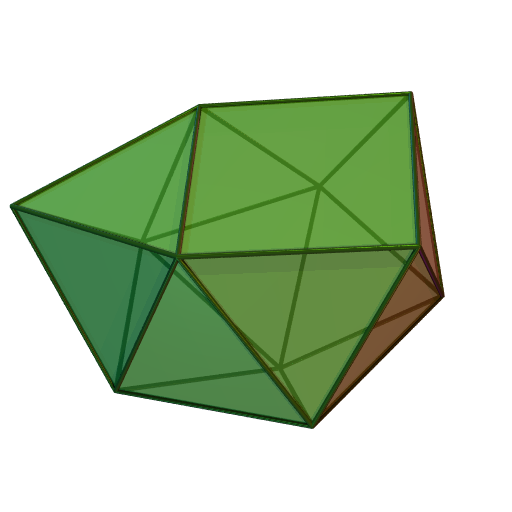
- Type: Johnson; J_{86} – J_{87} – J_{88}
- Faces: 16 triangles 1 square
- Edges: 26
- Vertices: 11
- Vertex configuration: 1(3^{4}); 2(3^{3}.4); 3×2(3^{5}); 2(3^{4}.4)
- Symmetry group: C_{s}
- Dual polyhedron: -
- Properties: convex

Net
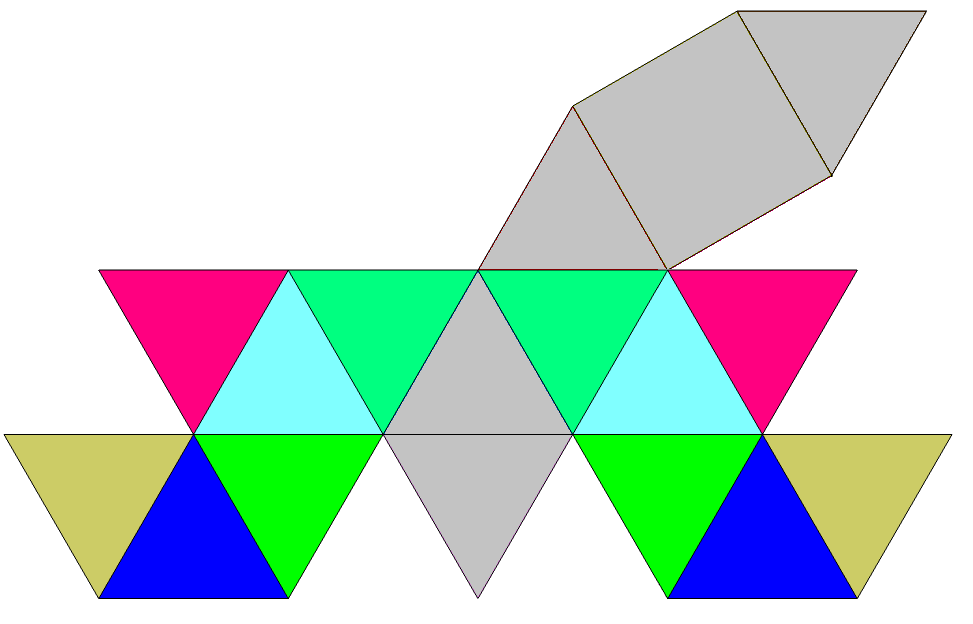

3D model of an augmented sphenocorona

In geometry, the augmented sphenocorona is the Johnson solid that can be constructed by attaching an equilateral square pyramid to one of the square faces of the sphenocorona. It is the only Johnson solid arising from "cut and paste" manipulations where the components are not all prisms, antiprisms or sections of Platonic or Archimedean solids.

== Construction ==
The augmented sphenocorona is constructed by attaching equilateral square pyramid to the sphenocorona, a process known as the augmentation. This pyramid covers one square face of the sphenocorona, replacing it with four equilateral triangles. As a result, the augmented sphenocorona has 16 equilateral triangles and 1 square as its faces. The convex polyhedron with regular faces is the Johnson solid; the augmented sphenocorona is one of them, enumerated as $J_{87}$, the 87th Johnson solid.

== Properties ==
For the edge length $a$, the surface area of an augmented sphenocorona is by summing the area of 16 equilateral triangles and 1 square:
$$\left(1+4\sqrt{3}\right)a^2\approx7.92820a^2,$$
Its volume can be calculated by slicing it into a sphenocorona and an equilateral square pyramid, and adding the volume subsequently:
$$\left(\frac{1}{2}\sqrt{1 + 3 \sqrt{\frac{3}{2}} + \sqrt{13 + 3 \sqrt{6}}}+\frac{1}{3\sqrt{2}}\right)a^3\approx1.75105a^3.$$
