= Triangular hebesphenorotunda =

92nd Johnson solid (20 faces)

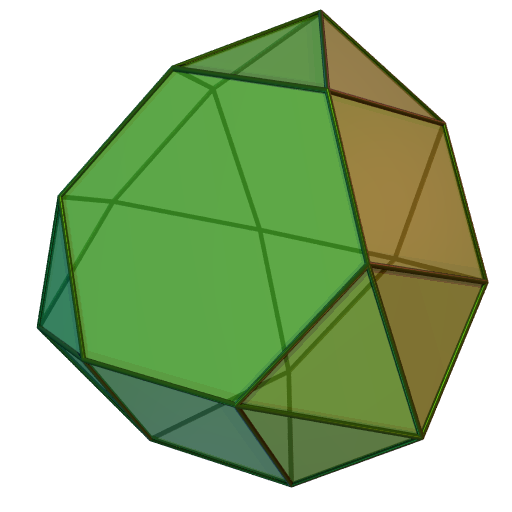
- Type: Johnson; J_{91} – J_{92} – J_{1}
- Faces: 13 triangles 3 squares 3 pentagons 1 hexagon
- Edges: 36
- Vertices: 18
- Vertex configuration: 3(3^{3}.5); 6(3.4.3.5); 3(3.5.3.5); 2.3(3^{2}.4.6)
- Symmetry group: C_{3v}
- Dual polyhedron: -
- Properties: convex, elementary

Net
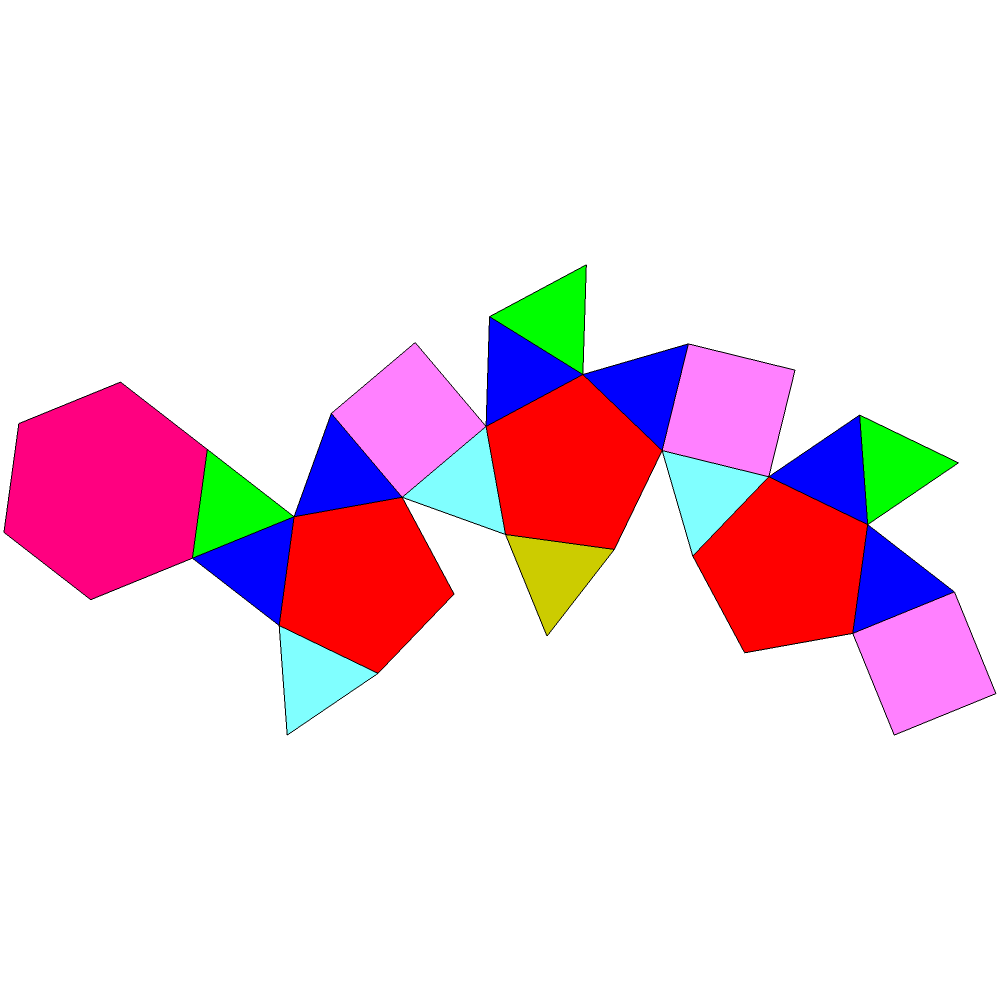

3D model of a triangular hebesphenorotunda

In geometry, the triangular hebesphenorotunda is a Johnson solid with 13 equilateral triangles, 3 squares, 3 regular pentagons, and 1 regular hexagon, meaning the total of its faces is 20.

== Properties ==
The original name is attributed to Johnson (1966), with two affixes. The prefix hebespheno- refers to a blunt wedge-like complex formed by three adjacent lunes, a figure where two equilateral triangles are attached at the opposite sides of a square, whereas the suffix (triangular) -rotunda refers to the complex of three equilateral triangles and three regular pentagons surrounding another equilateral triangle, which bears a structural resemblance to the pentagonal rotunda. Therefore, the triangular hebesphenorotunda has twenty faces: thirteen equilateral triangles, three squares, three regular pentagons, and one regular hexagon. The faces are all regular polygons, categorizing the triangular hebesphenorotunda as a Johnson solid, enumerated the last one $J_{92}$. It is an elementary polyhedron, meaning that it cannot be separated by a plane into two small regular-faced polyhedra.

The surface area of a triangular hebesphenorotunda of edge length $a$ is:
$$A = \left(3+\frac{1}{4}\sqrt{1308+90\sqrt{5}+114\sqrt{75+30\sqrt{5}}}\right)a^2 \approx 16.389a^2,$$
and its volume is:
$$V = \frac{1}{6}\left(15+7\sqrt{5}\right)a^3\approx5.10875a^3.$$

== Cartesian coordinates ==
The triangular hebesphenorotunda with edge length $\sqrt{5} - 1$ can be constructed by the union of the orbits of the Cartesian coordinates:
$$\begin{align}
\left( 0,-\frac{2}{\tau\sqrt{3}},\frac{2\tau}{\sqrt{3}} \right), \qquad &\left( \tau,\frac{1}{\sqrt{3}\tau^2},\frac{2}{\sqrt{3}} \right) \\
\left( \tau,-\frac{\tau}{\sqrt{3}},\frac{2}{\sqrt{3}\tau} \right), \qquad &\left(\frac{2}{\tau},0,0\right),
\end{align}$$
under the action of the group generated by rotation by 120° around the z-axis and the reflection about the yz-plane. Here, $\tau$ denotes the golden ratio.
