= Bilunabirotunda =

91st Johnson solid (14 faces)

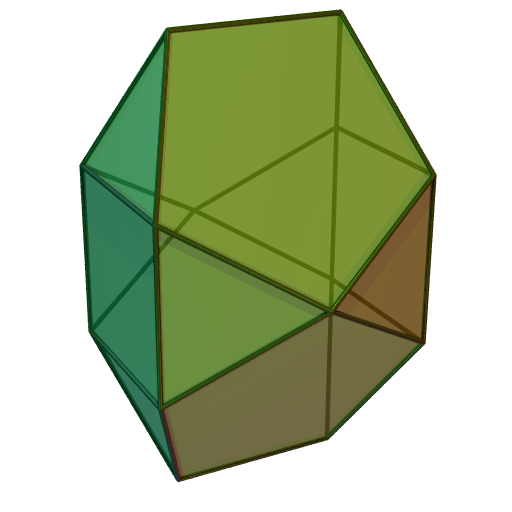
- Type: Johnson; J_{90} – J_{91} – J_{92}
- Faces: 8 triangles 2 squares 4 pentagons
- Edges: 26
- Vertices: 14
- Vertex configuration: 4(3.5^{2}); 8(3.4.3.5); 2(3.5.3.5)
- Symmetry group: $\mathrm{D}_{2\mathrm{h}}$
- Properties: convex, elementary

Net
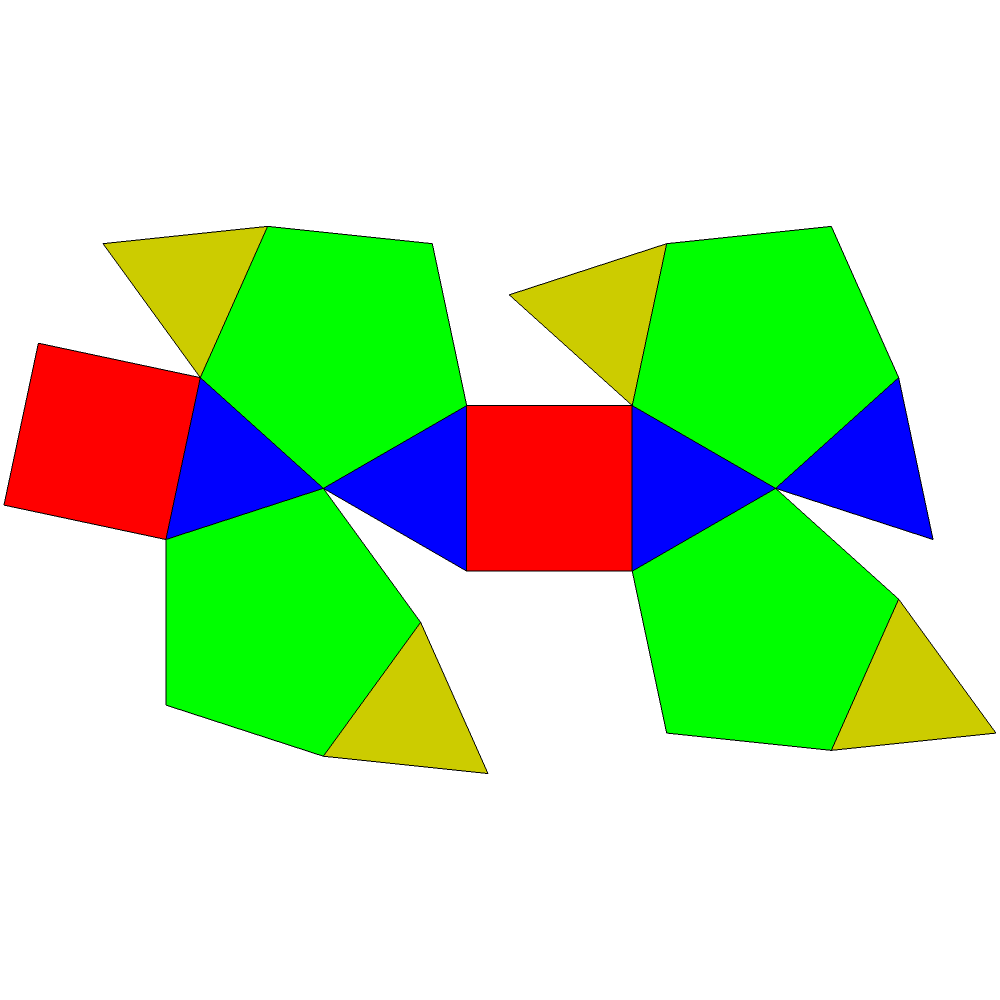

3D model of a bilunabirotunda

In geometry, the bilunabirotunda is a Johnson solid with faces of 8 equilateral triangles, 2 squares, and 4 regular pentagons.

== Properties ==
The bilunabirotunda consists of two (bi‑) lunes, each consisting of a square between two triangles, and two (bi‑) partial rotundae, in which two pentagons and two triangles alternate around a single vertex as in the pentagonal rotunda. Therefore, the faces of a bilunabirotunda possess 8 equilateral triangles, 2 squares, and 4 regular pentagons as it faces. It is one of the Johnson solids—a convex polyhedron in which all of the faces are regular polygon—enumerated as 91st Johnson solid $J_{91}$.

The surface area of a bilunabirotunda with edge length $a$ is:
$$\left(2 + 2\sqrt{3} + \sqrt{5(5 + 2\sqrt{5})}\right)a^2 \approx 12.346a^2,$$
and the volume of a bilunabirotunda is:
$$\frac{17 + 9\sqrt{5}}{12}a^3 \approx 3.0937a^3.$$

== Construction ==
The bilunabirotunda is an elementary polyhedron: it cannot be separated by a plane into two small regular-faced polyhedra. One way to construct a bilunabirotunda is by attaching two wedges and two tridiminished icosahedrons.

For edge length $\sqrt{5} - 1$, the coordinates of the bilunabirotunda may be given as
$$\begin{align}
& (0, 0, \pm 1), \\
& \left( \pm \frac{\sqrt{5} - 1}{2}, \pm 1, \pm \frac{\sqrt{5} - 1}{2} \right), \\
& \left( \pm \frac{\sqrt{5} + 1}{2}, \pm \frac{\sqrt{5} - 1}{2}, 0 \right).
\end{align}$$

== Applications ==
Reynolds (2004) discusses the bilunabirotunda as a shape that could be used in architecture.

== Related polyhedra and honeycombs ==
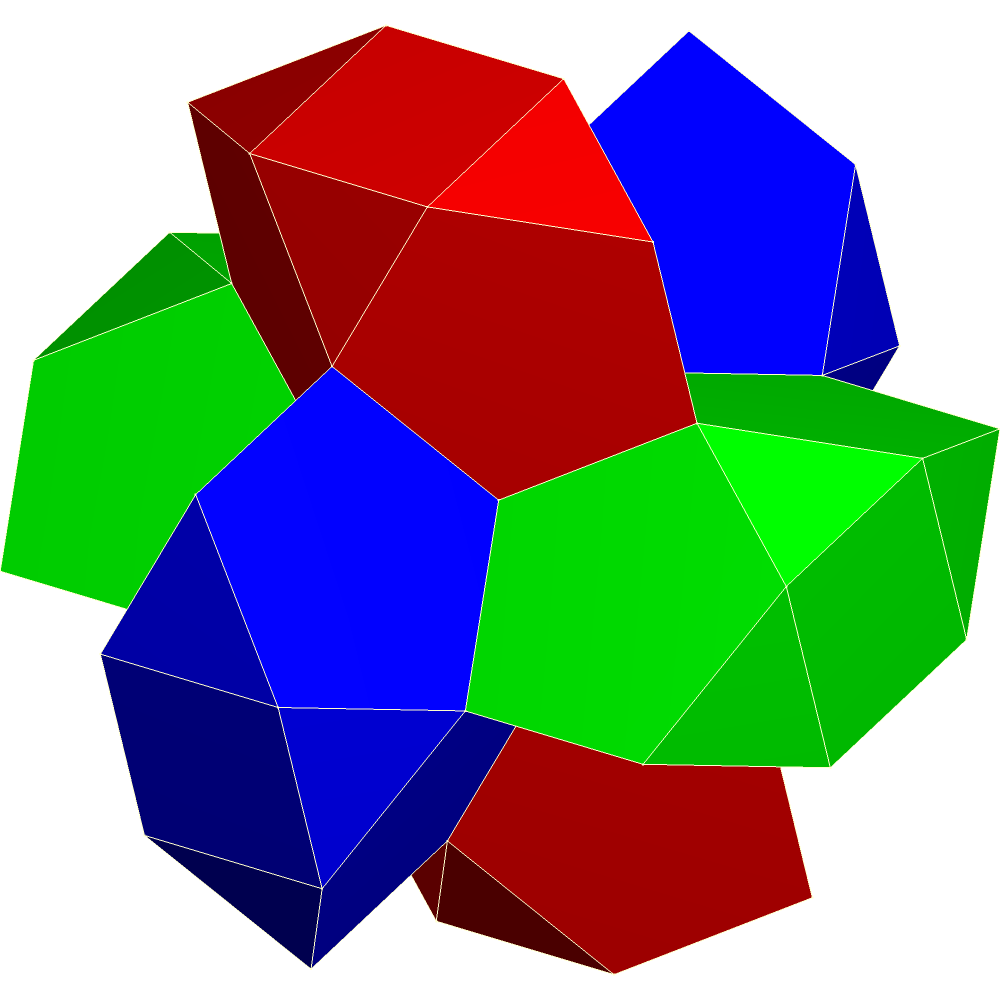
Six bilunabirotundae around a cube

Six bilunabirotundae can be augmented around a cube with pyritohedral symmetry. B. M. Stewart labeled this six-bilunabirotunda model as 6J_{91}(P_{4}). The bilunabirotunda can form a space-filling honeycomb together with the regular dodecahedron and cube, in which this same arrangement of bilunabirotundae around a cube appears.
