= Elongated square cupola =

Polyhedron with a square cupola and an octagonal prism

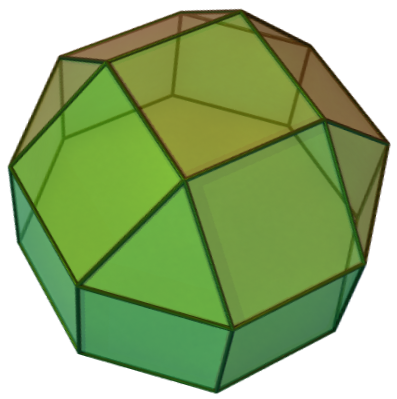
- Type: Johnson; J_{18} – J_{19} – J_{20}
- Faces: 4 triangles 13 squares 1 octagon
- Edges: 36
- Vertices: 20
- Vertex configuration: 8(4^{2}.8); 4+8(3.4^{3})
- Symmetry group: C_{4v}
- Dual polyhedron: -
- Properties: convex

Net
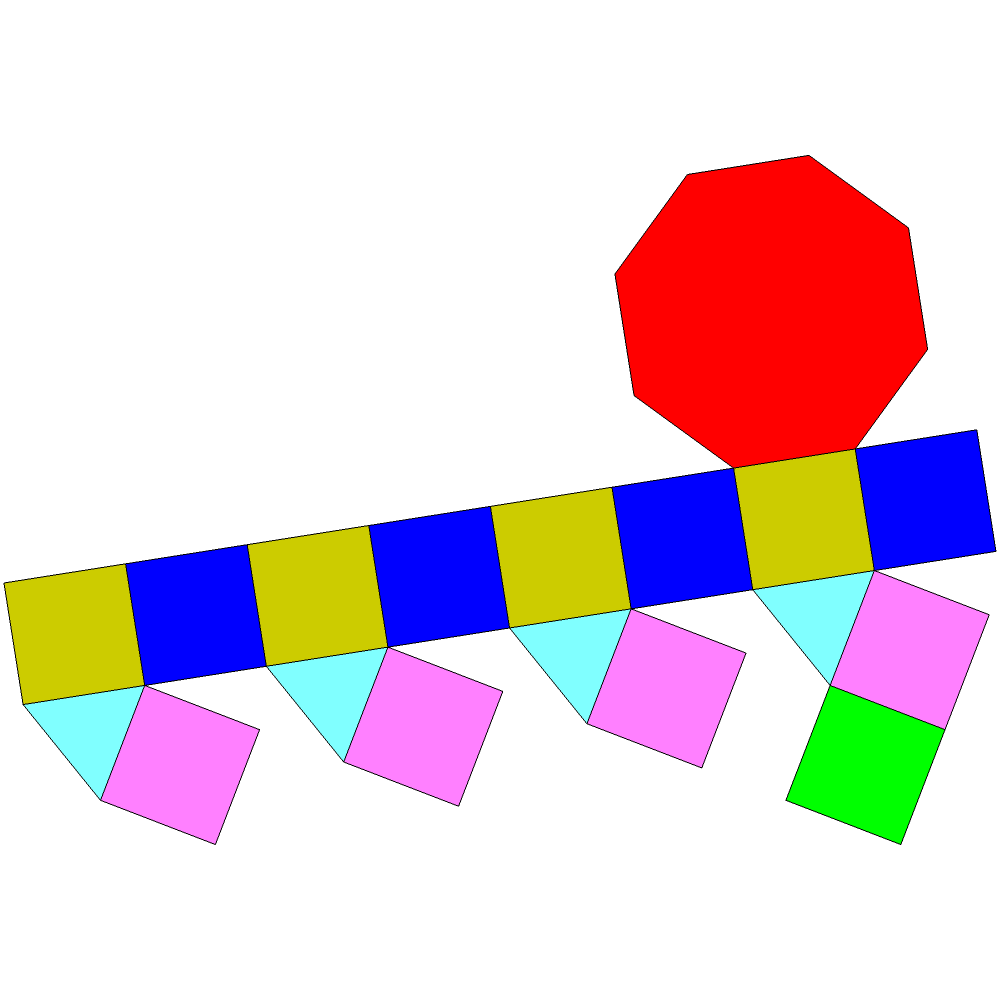

In geometry, the elongated square cupola is a polyhedron constructed from an octagonal prism by attaching square cupola onto its base. It is an example of Johnson solid.

== Construction ==
The elongated square cupola is constructed from an octagonal prism by attaching a square cupola onto one of its bases, a process known as the elongation. This cupola covers the octagonal face so that the resulting polyhedron has four equilateral triangles, thirteen squares, and one regular octagon. It can also be constructed by removing a square cupola from a rhombicuboctahedron, which would also make it a diminished rhombicuboctahedron. A convex polyhedron in which all of the faces are regular polygons is the Johnson solid. The elongated square cupola is one of them, enumerated as the nineteenth Johnson solid $J_{19}$.

== Properties ==
3D model of an elongated square cupola

The surface area of an elongated square cupola $A$ is the sum of all polygonal faces' area. Its volume $V$ can be ascertained by dissecting it into both a square cupola and a regular octagon, and then adding their volume. Given the elongated square cupola with edge length $a$, its surface area and volume are:
$$\begin{align}
A &= \left(15+2\sqrt{2}+\sqrt{3}\right)a^2 \approx 19.561a^2, \\
V &= \left(3+\frac{8\sqrt{2}}{3}\right)a^3 \approx 6.771a^3.
\end{align}$$
Its circumradius $C$ is:
$$C = \frac{1}{2}a \sqrt{5 + 2\sqrt{2}}.$$
