= Johnson solid =

Convex polyhedron with regular faces

In geometry, a Johnson solid, sometimes also known as a Johnson–Zalgaller solid, is a convex polyhedron whose faces are regular polygons and that is not a uniform polyhedron. There are 92 such solids:

- 48 composed of the primitive pyramids, cupolas, and rotundas assembled in various ways together with prisms and antiprisms;
- 35 formed by modifying uniform polyhedra, by augmenting, diminishing, or gyrating with primitives; and
- 9 which are not derived from "cut-and-paste" manipulations of uniform solids.

== Definition and background ==
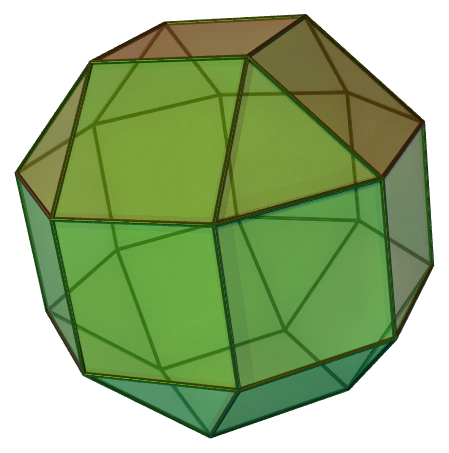
The polyhedron on the left, the elongated square gyrobicupola, is a Johnson solid. The polyhedron on the right, the stella octangula, is not a Johnson solid: it has regular faces, but is not convex, since some of its diagonals lie outside the polyhedron.

A convex polyhedron is the convex hull of a finite set of points in 3-dimensional space, not all in a plane. Its boundary is a finite union of polygons, no two in the same plane; those polygons are called the faces. A Johnson solid is a convex polyhedron whose faces are all regular polygons, but not a uniform polyhedron; the last condition excludes the Platonic solids, Archimedean solids, prisms, and antiprisms.

The solids are named after Norman Johnson and Victor Zalgaller. Johnson (1966) published a list of 92 such solids and assigned them their names and numbers. Zalgaller (1969) proved Johnson's conjecture that there were none beyond these 92.

A convex polyhedron in which all faces are nearly regular, but some are not precisely regular, is known as a near-miss Johnson solid.

== Naming and construction of solids ==
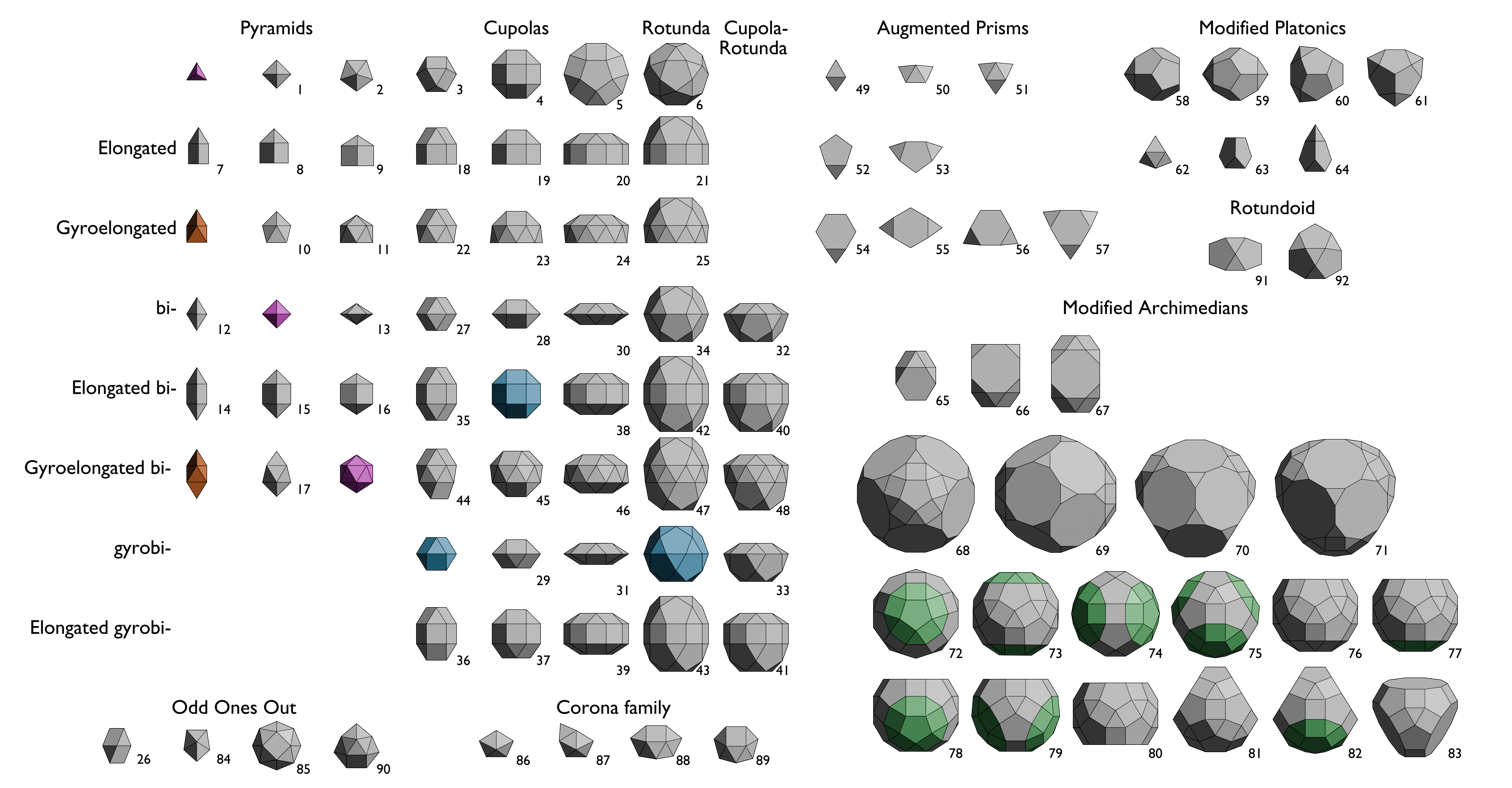
The 92 Johnson Solids and some related shapes. (see an animated version here).

- invalid, - Platonic, - Archimedean, - Gyrated sections.

The naming of Johnson solids follows a flexible and precise descriptive formula that allows many solids to be named in multiple different ways without compromising the accuracy of each name as a description. The names of the Johnson solids are described in the following sections.

=== Pyramids, cupolas, rotundas ===
The first 48 Johnson solids are constructed from pyramids, cupolas, or rotundas, combined with prisms or antiprisms. The following prefixes are attached to the word to indicate specific combinations of shapes:

- Bi- indicates that two copies of the solid are joined base-to-base.
  - For cupolas and rotundas, ortho- indicates that like faces meet.
  - For cupolas and rotundas, gyro- indicates that unlike faces meet.
- Elongated indicates a prism is joined to the base of the solid, or between the bases.
- Gyroelongated indicates an antiprism is joined to the base of the solid, or between the bases.

Using this nomenclature, a pentagonal bipyramid is a solid constructed by attaching two bases of pentagonal pyramids. Triangular orthobicupola is constructed by two triangular cupolas along their bases.

Excluded solids: - coplanar, - Platonic, - Archimedean.

	Pyramids			Cupolas			Cupola-Rotunda	Rotundas
	Tetrahedron "triangular pyramid"	1 Square pyramid	2 Pentagonal pyramid	3 Triangular cupola	4 Square cupola	5 Pentagonal cupola		6 Pentagonal rotunda
Elongated	7 Elongated triangular pyramid	8 Elongated square pyramid	9 Elongated pentagonal pyramid	18; Elongated triangular cupola	19; Elongated square cupola	20; Elongated pentagonal cupola		21; Elongated pentagonal rotunda
Gyroelongated	Augmented octahedron "Gyroelongated triangular pyramid"	10; Gyroelongated square pyramid	11; Gyroelongated pentagonal pyramid	22; Gyroelongated triangular cupola	23; Gyroelongated square cupola	24; Gyroelongated pentagonal cupola		25; Gyroelongated pentagonal rotunda
orthobi-	12; Triangular bipyramid	Octahedron "Square bipyramid"	13; Pentagonal bipyramid	27; Triangular orthobicupola	28; Square orthobicupola	30; Pentagonal orthobicupola	32; Pentagonal orthocupolarotunda	34; Pentagonal orthobirotunda
gyrobi-	12; Triangular bipyramid	Octahedron "Square bipyramid"	13; Pentagonal bipyramid	Cuboctahedron "Triangular gyrobicupola"	29; Square gyrobicupola	31; Pentagonal gyrobicupola	33; Pentagonal gyrocupolarotunda	Icosidodecahedron "pentagonal gyrobirotunda"
Elongated orthobi-	14; Elongated triangular bipyramid	15; Elongated square bipyramid	16; Elongated pentagonal bipyramid	35; Elongated triangular orthobicupola	Rhombicuboctahedron "Elongated square orthobicupola"	38; Elongated pentagonal orthobicupola	40; Elongated pentagonal orthocupolarotunda	42; Elongated pentagonal orthobirotunda
Elongated gyrobi-	14; Elongated triangular bipyramid	15; Elongated square bipyramid	16; Elongated pentagonal bipyramid	36; Elongated triangular gyrobicupola	37; Elongated square gyrobicupola	39; Elongated pentagonal gyrobicupola	41; Elongated pentagonal gyrocupolarotunda	43; Elongated pentagonal gyrobirotunda
Gyroelongated bi-	Trigonal trapezohedron "Gyroelongated triangular bipyramid"	17; Gyroelongated square bipyramid	Icosahedron "Gyroelongated pentagonal bipyramid"	44; Gyroelongated triangular bicupola	45; Gyroelongated square bicupola	46; Gyroelongated pentagonal bicupola	47; Gyroelongated pentagonal cupolarotunda	48; Gyroelongated pentagonal birotunda

	Fastigium
gyrobi-	26; Gyrobifastigium

=== Modified uniform polyhedra ===
A triangular prism is augmented by three square pyramids, becoming a triaugmented triangular prism.

A rhombicosidodecahedron being diminished.

A rhombicosidodecahedron being gyrated

The next 35 Johnson solids are constructed by modifying uniform polyhedra such as prisms, Platonic, or Archimedean solids by adding, subtracting, or rotating pyramids or cupolas. The following prefixes are attached to the word to indicate additions, subtractions, or rotations:

- Augmented indicates a pyramid or cupola is added to one or more faces of the solid in question.
- Diminished indicates a pyramid or cupola is removed from one or more faces of the solid in question.
- Gyrate indicates a cupola mounted on or featured in the solid in question is rotated such that different edges match up.

The three operations—augmentation, diminution, and gyration—can be performed multiple times for certain large solids. Bi- & Tri- indicate a double and triple operation respectively. For example, a bigyrate solid has two rotated cupolas, and a tridiminished solid has three removed pyramids or cupolas. In certain large solids, a distinction is made between solids where altered faces are parallel and solids where altered faces are oblique. Para- indicates the former, that the solid in question has altered parallel faces, and meta- the latter, altered oblique faces. For example, a parabiaugmented solid has had two parallel faces augmented, and a metabigyrate solid has had two oblique cupolas gyrated.

Augmented from	Prisms augmented by pyramids			
Triangular prism	49; Augmented triangular prism	50; Biaugmented triangular prism	51; Triaugmented triangular prism	
Pentagonal prism	52; Augmented pentagonal prism	53; Biaugmented pentagonal prism		
Hexagonal prism	54; Augmented hexagonal prism	55; Parabiaugmented hexagonal prism	56; Metabiaugmented hexagonal prism	57; Triaugmented hexagonal prism
Modified from	Platonics modified by pyramids			
Regular dodecahedron	58; Augmented dodecahedron	59; Parabiaugmented dodecahedron	60; Metabiaugmented dodecahedron	61; Triaugmented dodecahedron
Regular icosahedron	62; Metabidiminished icosahedron	63; Tridiminished icosahedron	64; Augmented tridiminished icosahedron	
Modified from	Archimedeans modified by cupolas			
Truncated tetrahedron	65; Augmented truncated tetrahedron			
Truncated cube	66; Augmented truncated cube	67; Biaugmented truncated cube		
Truncated dodecahedron	68; Augmented truncated dodecahedron	69; Parabiaugmented truncated dodecahedron	70; Metabiaugmented truncated dodecahedron	71; Triaugmented truncated dodecahedron
Rhombicosidodecahedron	72; Gyrate rhombicosidodecahedron	73; Parabigyrate rhombicosidodecahedron	74; Metabigyrate rhombicosidodecahedron	75; Trigyrate rhombicosidodecahedron
Rhombicosidodecahedron	76; Diminished rhombicosidodecahedron	77; Paragyrate diminished rhombicosidodecahedron	78; Metagyrate diminished rhombicosidodecahedron	79; Bigyrate diminished rhombicosidodecahedron
Rhombicosidodecahedron	80; Parabidiminished rhombicosidodecahedron	81; Metabidiminished rhombicosidodecahedron	82; Gyrate bidiminished rhombicosidodecahedron	83; Tridiminished rhombicosidodecahedron

=== Non cut-and-paste ===
Nets of a lune (left) and a partial rotunda (right)

The last 9 Johnson solids have names based on certain polygon complexes from which they are assembled. These names are defined by Johnson with the following nomenclature:

- A lune is a figure of two triangles attached to opposite sides of a square. Prefixes indicating a complex of lunes are:
  - Spheno- is a wedgelike complex of two adjacent lunes. Dispheno- indicates two such complexes.
  - Hebespheno- is a blunt complex of three adjacent lunes.
- Suffixes indicating a complex of triangles are:
  - -corona is a crownlike complex of eight triangles.
  - -megacorona is a larger crownlike complex of twelve triangles.
  - -cingulum is a belt of twelve triangles.
- Suffix -rotunda indicates a complex of two or three pentagons with triangles between them, bearing a structural resemblance to the pentagonal rotunda.

Snub polyhedra
84; Snub disphenoid	85; Snub square antiprism
Formed from lunes and triangles
86; Sphenocorona	87; Augmented sphenocorona
88; Sphenomegacorona	89; Hebesphenomegacorona
90; Disphenocingulum
Rotundoids
91; Bilunabirotunda	92; Triangular hebesphenorotunda

== Notable subsets ==
=== Deltahedra ===
Five Johnson solids are deltahedra, with only triangle faces.

- J12 Triangular bipyramid
- J13 Pentagonal bipyramid
- J17 Gyroelongated square bipyramid
- J51 Triaugmented triangular prism
- J84 Snub disphenoid

=== Elementary solids ===
Seventeen Johnson solids may be categorized as elementary polyhedra, meaning they cannot be separated by a plane to create two small convex polyhedra with regular faces. The first six Johnson solids satisfy this criterion:

- J1 square pyramid
- J2 pentagonal pyramid
- J3 triangular cupola
- J4 square cupola
- J5 pentagonal cupola
- J6 pentagonal rotunda

The criterion is also satisfied by eleven other Johnson solids:

- J63 tridiminished icosahedron
- J80 parabidiminished rhombicosidodecahedron
- J83 tridiminished rhombicosidodecahedron
- J84 snub disphenoid
- J85 snub square antiprism
- J86 sphenocorona
- J88 sphenomegacorona
- J89 hebesphenomegacorona
- J90 disphenocingulum
- J91 bilunabirotunda
- J92 triangular hebesphenorotunda

=== Chiral solids ===
The five gyroelongated bicupolas or birotundas are chiral and have distinct left-handed and right-handed forms.

- J44 Gyroelongated triangular bicupola
- J45 Gyroelongated square bicupola
- J46 Gyroelongated pentagonal bicupola
- J47 Gyroelongated pentagonal cupolarotunda
- J48 Gyroelongated pentagonal birotunda

=== Circumscribable solids ===
Twenty five of the Johnson solids have vertices that exist on the surface of a sphere. All of them can be seen to be related to a Platonic or Archimedean solid by gyration, diminishment, or dissection.

Octahedron	Icosahedron			
J1	J2	J11	J62	J63

Cuboctahedron		Rhombicuboctahedron			Icosidodecahedron	
J3	J27	J4	J19	J37	J6	J34
Rhombicosidodecahedron
J5	J72	J73	J74	J75	J76	J77
J5	J78	J79	J80	J81	J82	J83

== Characteristics of solids ==
Every polyhedron has its own characteristics, including symmetry and measurement. An object is said to have symmetry if there is a transformation that maps it to itself. All of those transformations may be composed in a group, alongside the group's number of elements, known as the order. In two-dimensional space, these transformations include rotating around the center of a polygon and reflecting an object around the perpendicular bisector of a polygon. The mensuration of polyhedra includes the surface area and volume. An area is a two-dimensional measurement calculated by the product of length and width; for a polyhedron, the surface area is the sum of the areas of all of its faces. A volume is a measurement of a region in three-dimensional space. The volume of a polyhedron may be ascertained in different ways: either through its base and height (like for pyramids and prisms), by slicing it off into pieces and summing their individual volumes, or by finding the root of a polynomial representing the polyhedron.

A polygon that is rotated symmetrically by $\frac{360^\circ}{n}$ is denoted by $C_n$, a cyclic group of order $n$; combining this with the reflection symmetry results in the symmetry of dihedral group $D_n$ of order $2n$. In three-dimensional symmetry point groups, the transformations preserving a polyhedron's symmetry include the rotation around the line passing through the base center, known as the axis of symmetry, and the reflection relative to perpendicular planes passing through the bisector of a base, which is known as the pyramidal symmetry $C_{n \mathrm{v}}$ of order $2n$. The transformation that preserves a polyhedron's symmetry by reflecting it across a horizontal plane is known as the prismatic symmetry $D_{n \mathrm{h}}$ of order $4n$. The antiprismatic symmetry $D_{n \mathrm{d}}$ of order $4n$ preserves the symmetry by rotating its half bottom and reflection across the horizontal plane. The symmetry group $C_{n \mathrm{h}}$ of order $2n$ preserves the symmetry by rotation around the axis of symmetry and reflection on the horizontal plane; the specific case preserving the symmetry by one full rotation is $C_{1 \mathrm{h}}$ of order 2, often denoted as $C_s$.

The table below lists the properties of the 92 (non-uniform) Johnson solids. The table includes each solid's enumeration (denoted as $J_n$). It also includes each solid's symmetry group and number of vertices, edges, and faces, as well as its surface area and volume when constructed with edge length 1. For simplicity, the table uses the quantity $\alpha = 5 + 2 \sqrt{5}$.

Table of the 92 Johnson solids
$J_n$	Solid name	Image	Vertices	Edges	Faces	Symmetry group and order	Surface area, exact	Surface area, approx.	Volume, exact	Volume, approx.
1	Square pyramid		5	8	5	$C_{4v}$ of order 8	$1 + \sqrt{3}$	2.7321	$\frac{\sqrt{2}}{6}$	0.2357
2	Pentagonal pyramid		6	10	6	$C_{5v}$ of order 10	$\frac{1}{2}\sqrt{\frac{5}{2}\left(10+\sqrt{5}+\sqrt{15\alpha}\right)}$	3.8855	$\frac{5 + \sqrt{5}}{24}$	0.3015
3	Triangular cupola		9	15	8	$C_{3v}$ of order 6	$3+\frac{5\sqrt{3}}{2}$	7.3301	$\frac{5}{3\sqrt{2}}$	1.1785
4	Square cupola		12	20	10	$C_{4v}$ of order 8	$7+2\sqrt{2}+\sqrt{3}$	11.5605	$1+\frac{2\sqrt{2}}{3}$	1.9428
5	Pentagonal cupola		15	25	12	$C_{5v}$ of order 10	$5+\frac{5\sqrt{3}+\sqrt{155\alpha-50}}{4}$	16.5798	$\frac{5+4\sqrt{5}}{6}$	2.3241
6	Pentagonal rotunda		20	35	17	$C_{5v}$ of order 10	$\frac{5\sqrt{3}+\sqrt{145\alpha-75}}{2}$	22.3472	$\frac{45+17\sqrt{5}}{12}$	6.9178
7	Elongated triangular pyramid		7	12	7	$C_{3v}$ of order 6	$3+\sqrt{3}$	4.7321	$\frac{\sqrt{2}+3\sqrt{3}}{12}$	0.5509
8	Elongated square pyramid		9	16	9	$C_{4v}$ of order 8	$5 + \sqrt{3}$	6.7321	$1 + \frac{\sqrt{2}}{6}$	1.2357
9	Elongated pentagonal pyramid		11	20	11	$C_{5v}$ of order 10	$5 + \frac{5\sqrt{3} + \sqrt{5\alpha}}{4}$	8.8855	$\frac{5 + \sqrt{5} + 6\sqrt{5\alpha}}{24}$	2.022
10	Gyroelongated square pyramid		9	20	13	$C_{4v}$ of order 8	$1 + 3\sqrt{3}$	6.1962	$\frac{\sqrt{2}+2 \sqrt{4+3 \sqrt{2}}}{6}$	1.1927
11	Gyroelongated pentagonal pyramid (diminished icosahedron)		11	25	16	$C_{5v}$ of order 10	$\frac{15 \sqrt{3}+\sqrt{5\alpha}}{4}$	8.2157	$\frac{25+9 \sqrt{5}}{24}$	1.8802
12	Triangular bipyramid		5	9	6	$D_{3h}$ of order 12	$\frac{3\sqrt{3}}{2}$	2.5981	$\frac{\sqrt{2}}{6}$	0.2357
13	Pentagonal bipyramid		7	15	10	$D_{5h}$ of order 20	$\frac{5 \sqrt{3}}{2}$	4.3301	$\frac{5+\sqrt{5}}{12}$	0.6030
14	Elongated triangular bipyramid		8	15	9	$D_{3h}$ of order 12	$3 + \frac{3\sqrt{3}}{2}$	5.5981	$\frac{\sqrt{2}}{6} + \frac{\sqrt{3}}{4}$	0.6687
15	Elongated square bipyramid		10	20	12	$D_{4h}$ of order 16	$4 + 2\sqrt{3}$	7.4641	$1 + \frac{\sqrt{2}}{3}$	1.4714
16	Elongated pentagonal bipyramid		12	25	15	$D_{5h}$ of order 20	$5 + \frac{5}{2}\sqrt{3}$	9.3301	$\frac{5+\sqrt{5}+3 \sqrt{5\alpha}}{12}$	2.3235
17	Gyroelongated square bipyramid		10	24	16	$D_{4d}$ of order 16	$4 \sqrt{3}$	6.9282	$\frac{\sqrt{2} + \sqrt{4 + 3 \sqrt{2}}}{3}$	1.4284
18	Elongated triangular cupola		15	27	14	$C_{3v}$ of order 6	$9 + \frac{5}{2}\sqrt{3}$	13.3301	$\frac{5\sqrt{2}+9\sqrt{3}}{6}$	3.7766
19	Elongated square cupola		20	36	18	$C_{4v}$ of order 8	$15+2 \sqrt{2}+\sqrt{3}$	19.5605	$3+\frac{8 \sqrt{2}}{3}$	6.7712
20	Elongated pentagonal cupola		25	45	22	$C_{5v}$ of order 10	$15 + \frac{5 \sqrt{3}+10 \sqrt{\alpha}+\sqrt{5\alpha}}{4}$	26.5798	$\frac{5+4 \sqrt{5}+15 \sqrt{\alpha}}{6}$	10.0183
21	Elongated pentagonal rotunda		30	55	27	$C_{5v}$ of order 10	$10 + \frac{5 \sqrt{3}+5 \sqrt{\alpha}+3 \sqrt{5\alpha}}{2}$	32.3472	$\frac{45+17 \sqrt{5}+30 \sqrt{\alpha}}{12}$	14.612
22	Gyroelongated triangular cupola		15	33	20	$C_{3v}$ of order 6	$3 + \frac{11}{2}\sqrt{3}$	12.5263	$\frac{1}{3} \sqrt{\frac{61}{2}+18 \sqrt{3}+30 \sqrt{1+\sqrt{3}}}$	3.5161
23	Gyroelongated square cupola		20	44	26	$C_{4v}$ of order 8	$7+2 \sqrt{2}+5 \sqrt{3}$	18.4887	$1+\frac{2}{3}\sqrt{2} + \frac{2}{3}\sqrt{4+2\sqrt{2}+2\sqrt{146+103\sqrt{2}}}$	6.2108
24	Gyroelongated pentagonal cupola		25	55	32	$C_{5v}$ of order 10	$5 + \frac{25 \sqrt{3}+10 \sqrt{\alpha}+\sqrt{5\alpha}}{4}$	25.2400	$\frac{5}{6}+\frac{2}{3}\sqrt{5} + \frac{5}{6}\sqrt{2\sqrt{145\alpha-75}-2\sqrt{5}-2}$	9.0733
25	Gyroelongated pentagonal rotunda		30	65	37	$C_{5v}$ of order 10	$\frac{15\sqrt{3}+\left(\alpha+\sqrt{5}\right)\sqrt{\alpha}}{2}$	31.0075	$\frac{45+17\sqrt{5} + 10\sqrt{2\sqrt{145\alpha-75}-2\sqrt{5}-2}}{12}$	13.6671
26	Gyrobifastigium		8	14	8	$D_{2d}$ of order 8	$4+\sqrt{3}$	5.7321	$\frac{\sqrt{3}}{2}$	0.8660
27	Triangular orthobicupola		12	24	14	$D_{3h}$ of order 12	$6+2\sqrt{3}$	9.4641	$\frac{5\sqrt{2}}{3}$	2.3570
28	Square orthobicupola		16	32	18	$D_{4h}$ of order 16	$10+2\sqrt{3}$	13.4641	$2 + \frac{4\sqrt{2}}{3}$	3.8856
29	Square gyrobicupola		16	32	18	$D_{4d}$ of order 16	$10+2\sqrt{3}$	13.4641	$2 + \frac{4\sqrt{2}}{3}$	3.8856
30	Pentagonal orthobicupola		20	40	22	$D_{5h}$ of order 20	$10+\frac{\sqrt{75+5\alpha+10\sqrt{15\alpha}}}{2}$	17.7711	$\frac{5+4\sqrt{5}}{3}$	4.6481
31	Pentagonal gyrobicupola		20	40	22	$D_{5d}$ of order 20	$10+\frac{\sqrt{75+5\alpha+10\sqrt{15\alpha}}}{2}$	17.7711	$\frac{5+4\sqrt{5}}{3}$	4.6481
32	Pentagonal orthocupolarotunda		25	50	27	$C_{5v}$ of order 10	$5 + \frac{\sqrt{675+245\alpha+210\sqrt{15\alpha}}}{4}$	23.5385	$\frac{55+25\sqrt{5}}{12}$	9.2418
33	Pentagonal gyrocupolarotunda		25	50	27	$C_{5v}$ of order 10	$5+\frac{15}{4}\sqrt{3}+\frac{7}{4}\sqrt{5\alpha}$	23.5385	$\frac{55+25\sqrt{5}}{12}$	9.2418
34	Pentagonal orthobirotunda		30	60	32	$D_{5h}$ of order 20	$5 \sqrt{3}+3 \sqrt{5\alpha}$	29.306	$\frac{45 + 17\sqrt{5}}{6}$	13.8355
35	Elongated triangular orthobicupola		18	36	20	$D_{3h}$ of order 12	$12+2\sqrt{3}$	15.4641	$\frac{5 \sqrt{2}}{3} + \frac{3 \sqrt{3}}{2}$	4.9551
36	Elongated triangular gyrobicupola		18	36	20	$D_{3d}$ of order 12	$12+2\sqrt{3}$	15.4641	$\frac{5 \sqrt{2}}{3} + \frac{3 \sqrt{3}}{2}$	4.9551
37	Elongated square gyrobicupola		24	48	26	$D_{4d}$ of order 16	$18 + 2\sqrt{3}$	21.4641	$4 + \frac{10\sqrt{2}}{3}$	8.714
38	Elongated pentagonal orthobicupola		30	60	32	$D_{5h}$ of order 20	$20+\frac{\sqrt{75+5\alpha+10\sqrt{15\alpha}}}{2}$	27.7711	$\frac{10+8\sqrt{5}+15\sqrt{\alpha}}{6}$	12.3423
39	Elongated pentagonal gyrobicupola		30	60	32	$D_{5d}$ of order 20	$20+\frac{\sqrt{75+5\alpha+10\sqrt{15\alpha}}}{2}$	27.7711	$\frac{10+8\sqrt{5}+15\sqrt{\alpha}}{6}$	12.3423
40	Elongated pentagonal orthocupolarotunda		35	70	37	$C_{5v}$ of order 10	$15 + \frac{\sqrt{675+245\alpha+210\sqrt{15\alpha}}}{4}$	33.5385	$\frac{55+25\sqrt{5}+30\sqrt{\alpha}}{12}$	16.936
41	Elongated pentagonal gyrocupolarotunda		35	70	37	$C_{5v}$ of order 10	$15 + \frac{\sqrt{675+245\alpha+210\sqrt{15\alpha}}}{4}$	33.5385	$\frac{55+25\sqrt{5}+30\sqrt{\alpha}}{12}$	16.936
42	Elongated pentagonal orthobirotunda		40	80	42	$D_{5h}$ of order 20	$10+\sqrt{75+45\alpha+30\sqrt{15\alpha}}$	39.306	$\frac{45+17\sqrt{5}+15\sqrt{\alpha}}{6}$	21.5297
43	Elongated pentagonal gyrobirotunda		40	80	42	$D_{5d}$ of order 20	$10+\sqrt{75+45\alpha+30\sqrt{15\alpha}}$	39.306	$\frac{45+17\sqrt{5}+15\sqrt{\alpha}}{6}$	21.5297
44	Gyroelongated triangular bicupola		18	42	26	$D_3$ of order 6	$6+5\sqrt{3}$	14.6603	$\frac{5}{3}\sqrt{2}+\sqrt{2+2\sqrt{3}}$	4.6946
45	Gyroelongated square bicupola		24	56	34	$D_4$ of order 8	$10+6\sqrt{3}$	20.3923	$2+\frac{4}{3}\sqrt{2} + \frac{2}{3}\sqrt{4+2\sqrt{2}+2\sqrt{146+103\sqrt{2}}}$	8.1536
46	Gyroelongated pentagonal bicupola		30	70	42	$D_5$ of order 10	$10+\frac{15}{2}\sqrt{3}+\frac{1}{2}\sqrt{5\alpha}$	26.4313	$\frac{5+4\sqrt{5}}{3} + \frac{5}{6}\sqrt{2\sqrt{145\alpha-75}-\alpha+3}$	11.3974
47	Gyroelongated pentagonal cupolarotunda		35	80	47	$C_5$ of order 5	$5 + \frac{7}{4}\left(5\sqrt{3}+\sqrt{5\alpha}\right)$	32.1988	$\frac{55 + 25\sqrt{5}}{12} + \frac{5}{6}\sqrt{2\sqrt{145\alpha-75}-\alpha+3}$	15.9911
48	Gyroelongated pentagonal birotunda		40	90	52	$D_5$ of order 10	$10\sqrt{3} + 3\sqrt{5\alpha}$	37.9662	$\frac{45+17\sqrt{5} + 5\sqrt{2\sqrt{145\alpha-75}-\alpha+3}}{6}$	20.5848
49	Augmented triangular prism		7	13	8	$C_{2v}$ of order 4	$2 + \frac{3}{2}\sqrt{3}$	4.5981	$\frac{\sqrt{2}}{6} + \frac{\sqrt{3}}{4}$	0.6687
50	Biaugmented triangular prism		8	17	11	$C_{2v}$ of order 4	$1 + \frac{5}{2}\sqrt{3}$	5.3301	$\sqrt{\frac{59}{144} + \frac{1}{\sqrt{6}}}$	0.9044
51	Triaugmented triangular prism		9	21	14	$D_{3h}$ of order 12	$\frac{7\sqrt{3}}{2}$	6.0622	$\frac{2\sqrt{2}+\sqrt{3}}{4}$	1.1401
52	Augmented pentagonal prism		11	19	10	$C_{2v}$ of order 4	$4 + \sqrt{3} + \frac{1}{2} \sqrt{5\alpha}$	9.173	$\frac{1}{12} \sqrt{8+45\alpha+12 \sqrt{10\alpha}}$	1.9562
53	Biaugmented pentagonal prism		12	23	13	$C_{2v}$ of order 4	$3 + 2\sqrt{3} + \frac{1}{2} \sqrt{5\alpha}$	9.9051	$\frac{1}{12} \sqrt{32+45\alpha+24 \sqrt{10\alpha}}$	2.1919
54	Augmented hexagonal prism		13	22	11	$C_{2v}$ of order 4	$5+4 \sqrt{3}$	11.9282	$\frac{\sqrt{2}}{6} + \frac{3 \sqrt{3}}{2}$	2.8338
55	Parabiaugmented hexagonal prism		14	26	14	$D_{2h}$ of order 8	$4+5 \sqrt{3}$	12.6603	$\frac{\sqrt{2}}{3} + \frac{3\sqrt{3}}{2}$	3.0695
56	Metabiaugmented hexagonal prism		14	26	14	$C_{2v}$ of order 4	$4+5 \sqrt{3}$	12.6603	$\frac{\sqrt{2}}{3} + \frac{3\sqrt{3}}{2}$	3.0695
57	Triaugmented hexagonal prism		15	30	17	$D_{3h}$ of order 12	$3 + 6 \sqrt{3}$	13.3923	$\frac{1}{\sqrt{2}}+\frac{3 \sqrt{3}}{2}$	3.3052
58	Augmented dodecahedron		21	35	16	$C_{5v}$ of order 10	$\frac{5 \sqrt{3}+11 \sqrt{5\alpha}}{4}$	21.0903	$\frac{95+43 \sqrt{5}}{24}$	7.9646
59	Parabiaugmented dodecahedron		22	40	20	$D_{5d}$ of order 20	$\frac{5}{2} \left(\sqrt{3}+\sqrt{5\alpha}\right)$	21.5349	$\frac{25+11 \sqrt{5}}{6}$	8.2661
60	Metabiaugmented dodecahedron		22	40	20	$C_{2v}$ of order 4	$\frac{5}{2} \left(\sqrt{3}+\sqrt{5\alpha}\right)$	21.5349	$\frac{25+11 \sqrt{5}}{6}$	8.2661
61	Triaugmented dodecahedron		23	45	24	$C_{3v}$ of order 6	$\frac{3}{4} \left(5 \sqrt{3}+3 \sqrt{5\alpha}\right)$	21.9795	$\frac{5}{8} \left(7+3 \sqrt{5}\right)$	8.5676
62	Metabidiminished icosahedron		10	20	12	$C_{2v}$ of order 4	$\frac{5 \sqrt{3}+\sqrt{5\alpha}}{2}$	7.7711	$\frac{\alpha}{6}$	1.5787
63	Tridiminished icosahedron		9	15	8	$C_{3v}$ of order 6	$\frac{5 \sqrt{3}+3 \sqrt{5\alpha}}{4}$	7.3265	$\frac{5}{8}+\frac{7 \sqrt{5}}{24}$	1.2772
64	Augmented tridiminished icosahedron		10	18	10	$C_{3v}$ of order 6	$\frac{7 \sqrt{3}+3 \sqrt{5\alpha}}{4}$	8.1925	$\frac{15+2 \sqrt{2}+7 \sqrt{5}}{24}$	1.3950
65	Augmented truncated tetrahedron		15	27	14	$C_{3v}$ of order 6	$3 + \frac{13}{2} \sqrt{3}$	14.2583	$\frac{11}{2 \sqrt{2}}$	3.8891
66	Augmented truncated cube		28	48	22	$C_{4v}$ of order 8	$15+10 \sqrt{2}+3 \sqrt{3}$	34.3383	$8+\frac{16 \sqrt{2}}{3}$	15.5425
67	Biaugmented truncated cube		32	60	30	$D_{4h}$ of order 16	$18 + 8 \sqrt{2} + 4 \sqrt{3}$	36.2419	$9+6 \sqrt{2}$	17.4853
68	Augmented truncated dodecahedron		65	105	42	$C_{5v}$ of order 10	$5 + \frac{25 \sqrt{3}+110 \sqrt{\alpha}+\sqrt{5\alpha}}{4}$	102.1821	$\frac{505}{12}+\frac{81 \sqrt{5}}{4}$	87.3637
69	Parabiaugmented truncated dodecahedron		70	120	52	$D_{5d}$ of order 20	$10 + 25 \sqrt{\alpha} + \frac{15 \sqrt{3}+\sqrt{5\alpha}}{2}$	103.3734	$\frac{515+251 \sqrt{5}}{12}$	89.6878
70	Metabiaugmented truncated dodecahedron		70	120	52	$C_{2v}$ of order 4	$10 + 25 \sqrt{\alpha} + \frac{15 \sqrt{3}+\sqrt{5\alpha}}{2}$	103.3734	$\frac{515+251 \sqrt{5}}{12}$	89.6878
71	Triaugmented truncated dodecahedron		75	135	62	$C_{3v}$ of order 6	$15+ \frac{35 \sqrt{3}+90 \sqrt{\alpha}+3 \sqrt{5\alpha}}{4}$	104.5648	$\frac{7}{12} \left(75+37 \sqrt{5}\right)$	92.0118
72	Gyrate rhombicosidodecahedron		60	120	62	$C_{5v}$ of order 10	$30+5 \sqrt{3}+3 \sqrt{5\alpha}$	59.306	$20+\frac{29 \sqrt{5}}{3}$	41.6153
73	Parabigyrate rhombicosidodecahedron		60	120	62	$D_{5d}$ of order 20	$30+5 \sqrt{3}+3 \sqrt{5\alpha}$	59.306	$20+\frac{29 \sqrt{5}}{3}$	41.6153
74	Metabigyrate rhombicosidodecahedron		60	120	62	$C_{2v}$ of order 4	$30+5 \sqrt{3}+3 \sqrt{5\alpha}$	59.306	$20+\frac{29 \sqrt{5}}{3}$	41.6153
75	Trigyrate rhombicosidodecahedron		60	120	62	$C_{3v}$ of order 6	$30+5 \sqrt{3}+3 \sqrt{5\alpha}$	59.306	$20+\frac{29 \sqrt{5}}{3}$	41.6153
76	Diminished rhombicosidodecahedron		55	105	52	$C_{5v}$ of order 10	$25+ \frac{15 \sqrt{3}+10 \sqrt{\alpha}+11 \sqrt{5\alpha}}{4}$	58.1147	$\frac{115}{6}+9 \sqrt{5}$	39.2913
77	Paragyrate diminished rhombicosidodecahedron		55	105	52	$C_{5v}$ of order 10	$25+ \frac{15 \sqrt{3}+10 \sqrt{\alpha}+11 \sqrt{5\alpha}}{4}$	58.1147	$\frac{115}{6}+9 \sqrt{5}$	39.2913
78	Metagyrate diminished rhombicosidodecahedron		55	105	52	$C_s$ of order 2	$25+ \frac{15 \sqrt{3}+10 \sqrt{\alpha}+11 \sqrt{5\alpha}}{4}$	58.1147	$\frac{115}{6}+9 \sqrt{5}$	39.2913
79	Bigyrate diminished rhombicosidodecahedron		55	105	52	$C_s$ of order 2	$25+ \frac{15 \sqrt{3}+10 \sqrt{\alpha}+11 \sqrt{5\alpha}}{4}$	58.1147	$\frac{115}{6}+9 \sqrt{5}$	39.2913
80	Parabidiminished rhombicosidodecahedron		50	90	42	$D_{5d}$ of order 20	$20 + \frac{5}{2} \left(\sqrt{3}+2 \sqrt{\alpha}+\sqrt{5\alpha}\right)$	56.9233	$\frac{55 + 25 \sqrt{5}}{3}$	36.9672
81	Metabidiminished rhombicosidodecahedron		50	90	42	$C_{2v}$ of order 4	$20 + \frac{5}{2} \left(\sqrt{3}+2 \sqrt{\alpha}+\sqrt{5\alpha}\right)$	56.9233	$\frac{55 + 25 \sqrt{5}}{3}$	36.9672
82	Gyrate bidiminished rhombicosidodecahedron		50	90	42	$C_s$ of order 2	$20 + \frac{5}{2} \left(\sqrt{3}+2 \sqrt{\alpha}+\sqrt{5\alpha}\right)$	56.9233	$\frac{55 + 25 \sqrt{5}}{3}$	36.9672
83	Tridiminished rhombicosidodecahedron		45	75	32	$C_{3v}$ of order 6	$15+ \frac{5 \sqrt{3}+30 \sqrt{\alpha}+9 \sqrt{5\alpha}}{4}$	55.732	$\frac{35}{2}+\frac{23 \sqrt{5}}{3}$	34.6432
84	Snub disphenoid		8	18	12	$D_{2d}$ of order 8	$3 \sqrt{3}$	5.1962		0.8595
85	Snub square antiprism		16	40	26	$D_{4d}$ of order 16	$2 + 6 \sqrt{3}$	12.3923		3.6012
86	Sphenocorona		10	22	14	$C_{2v}$ of order 4	$2 + 3 \sqrt{3}$	7.1962	$\frac{1}{2} \sqrt{1+3 \sqrt{\frac{3}{2}}+\sqrt{13+3 \sqrt{6}}}$	1.5154
87	Augmented sphenocorona		11	26	17	$C_s$ of order 2	$1+4 \sqrt{3}$	7.9282	$\frac{1}{2}\sqrt{1 + 3 \sqrt{\frac{3}{2}} + \sqrt{13 + 3 \sqrt{6}}}+\frac{1}{3\sqrt{2}}$	1.7511
88	Sphenomegacorona		12	28	18	$C_{2v}$ of order 4	$2 + 4 \sqrt{3}$	8.9282		1.9481
89	Hebesphenomegacorona		14	33	21	$C_{2v}$ of order 4	$3 + \frac{9}{2} \sqrt{3}$	10.7942		2.9129
90	Disphenocingulum		16	38	24	$D_{2d}$ of order 8	$4+5 \sqrt{3}$	12.6603		3.7776
91	Bilunabirotunda		14	26	14	$D_{2h}$ of order 8	$2+2 \sqrt{3}+\sqrt{5\alpha}$	12.346	$\frac{17+9 \sqrt{5}}{12}$	3.0937
92	Triangular hebesphenorotunda		18	36	20	$C_{3v}$ of order 6	$3 + \frac{19 \sqrt{3}+3 \sqrt{5\alpha}}{4}$	16.3887	$\frac{5}{2}+\frac{7 \sqrt{5}}{6}$	5.1087

== See also ==
- Near-miss Johnson solid
- Blind polytope

== Bibliography ==
- Araki, Yoshiaki; Horiyama, Takashi; Uehara, Ryuhei (2015). "Common Unfolding of Regular Tetrahedron and Johnson-Zalgaller Solid". In Rahman, M. Sohel; Tomita, Etsuji (eds.). WALCOM: Algorithms and Computation. Lecture Notes in Computer Science. Vol. 8973. Cham: Springer International Publishing. pp. 294–305. doi:10.1007/978-3-319-15612-5_26. ISBN 978-3-319-15612-5.
- Cromwell, P. R. (1997). Polyhedra. Cambridge University Press. ISBN 978-0-521-66405-9.
- Diudea, M. V. (2018). Multi-shell Polyhedral Clusters. Carbon Materials: Chemistry and Physics. Vol. 10. Springer. doi:10.1007/978-3-319-64123-2. ISBN 978-3-319-64123-2.
- Flusser, J.; Suk, T.; Zitofa, B. (2017). 2D and 3D Image Analysis by Moments. John Wiley & Sons. ISBN 978-1-119-03935-8.
- Gagnon, Sylvain (1982). "Les polyèdres convexes aux faces régulières" [Convex polyhedra with regular faces] (PDF). Structural Topology (6): 83–95.
- Hergert, W.; Geilhufe, M. (2018). Group Theory in Solid State Physics and Photonics: Problem Solving with Mathematica. John Wiley & Sons. ISBN 978-3-527-41300-3.
- Parker, S. P. (1997). Dictionary of Mathematics. McGraw Hill. ISBN 978-0-070-52433-0.
- Powell, R. C. (2010). Symmetry, Group Theory, and the Physical Properties of Crystals. Lecture Notes in Physics. Vol. 824. Springer. doi:10.1007/978-1-4419-7598-0. ISBN 978-1-441-97598-0.
- Rajwade, A. R. (2001). Convex Polyhedra with Regularity Conditions and Hilbert's Third Problem. Texts and Readings in Mathematics. Hindustan Book Agency. doi:10.1007/978-93-86279-06-4. ISBN 978-9-386-27906-4.
- Solomon, R. (2003). Abstract Algebra. American Mathematical Society. ISBN 978-0-821-84795-4.
- Slobodan, M.; Obradović, M.; Ðukanović, G. (2015). "Composite Concave Cupolae as Geometric and Architectural Forms" (PDF). Journal for Geometry and Graphics. 19 (1): 79–91.
- Timofeenko, A. V. (2009). "The Non-Platonic and Non-Archimedean Noncomposite Polyhedra". Journal of Mathematical Sciences. 162 (5): 710–729. doi:10.1007/s10958-009-9655-0.
- Todesco, G. M. (2020). "Hyperbolic Honeycomb". In Emmer, M.; Abate, M. (eds.). Imagine Math 7: Between Culture and Mathematics. Springer. doi:10.1007/978-3-030-42653-8. ISBN 978-3-030-42653-8.
- Walsh, E. T. (2014). A First Course in Geometry. Dover. ISBN 978-0-486-78020-7.
- Williams, K.; Monteleone, C. (2021). Daniele Barbaro's Perspective of 1568. Springer. doi:10.1007/978-3-030-76687-0. ISBN 978-3-030-76687-0.
- Zalgaller, Victor A. (1969). Convex Polyhedra with Regular Faces. Consultants Bureau.
