= Gyroelongated pentagonal cupola =

24th Johnson solid (32 faces)

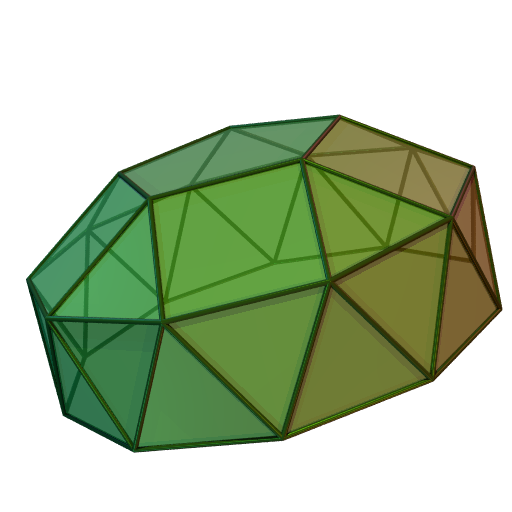
- Type: Johnson; J_{23} – J_{24} – J_{25}
- Faces: 3×5+10 triangles 5 squares 1 pentagon 1 decagon
- Edges: 55
- Vertices: 25
- Vertex configuration: 5(3.4.5.4); 2.5(3^{3}.10); 10(3^{4}.4)
- Symmetry group: C_{5v}
- Dual polyhedron: -
- Properties: convex

Net
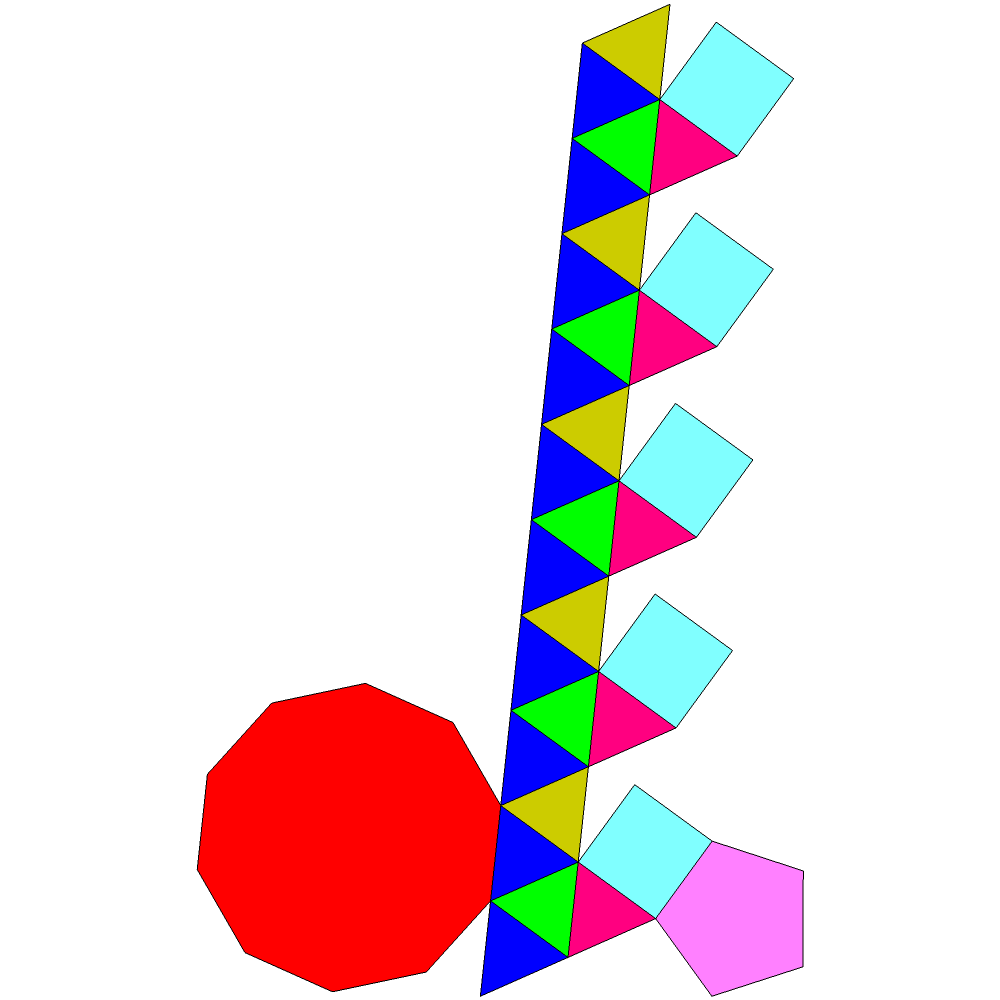

In geometry, the gyroelongated pentagonal cupola is one of the Johnson solids (J_{24}). As the name suggests, it can be constructed by gyroelongating a pentagonal cupola (J_{5}) by attaching a decagonal antiprism to its base. It can also be seen as a gyroelongated pentagonal bicupola (J_{46}) with one pentagonal cupola removed.

A Johnson solid is one of 92 strictly convex polyhedra that are composed of regular polygon faces but are not uniform polyhedra (that is, they are not Platonic solids, Archimedean solids, prisms, or antiprisms). They were named by Norman Johnson, who first listed these polyhedra in 1966.

3D model of a gyroelongated pentagonal cupola

== Area and volume ==
With edge length a, the surface area is

$$A=\frac{1}{4}\left( 20+25\sqrt{3}+\left(10+\sqrt{5}\right)\sqrt{5+2\sqrt{5}}\right)a^2\approx25.240003791...a^2,$$

and the volume is

$$V=\left(\frac{5}{6}+\frac{2}{3}\sqrt{5} + \frac{5}{6}\sqrt{2\sqrt{650+290\sqrt{5}}-2\sqrt{5}-2}\right) a^3\approx 9.073333194...a^3.$$

== Dual polyhedron ==
The dual of the gyroelongated pentagonal cupola has 25 faces: 10 kites, 5 rhombi, and 10 pentagons.

Dual gyroelongated pentagonal cupola	Net of dual
