= Gyroelongated pentagonal rotunda =

25th Johnson solid (37 faces)

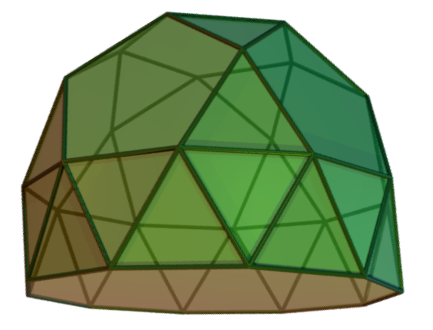
- Type: Johnson; J_{24} – J_{25} – J_{26}
- Faces: 37 (30 equilateral triangles, 6 pentagons, 1 decagon)
- Edges: 65
- Vertices: 30
- Vertex configuration: $2.5(3.5.3.5)$ $2.5(3^3.10)$ $10(3^4.5)$
- Symmetry group: $C_{5\mathrm{v}}$ of order 10
- Properties: convex, composite

Net
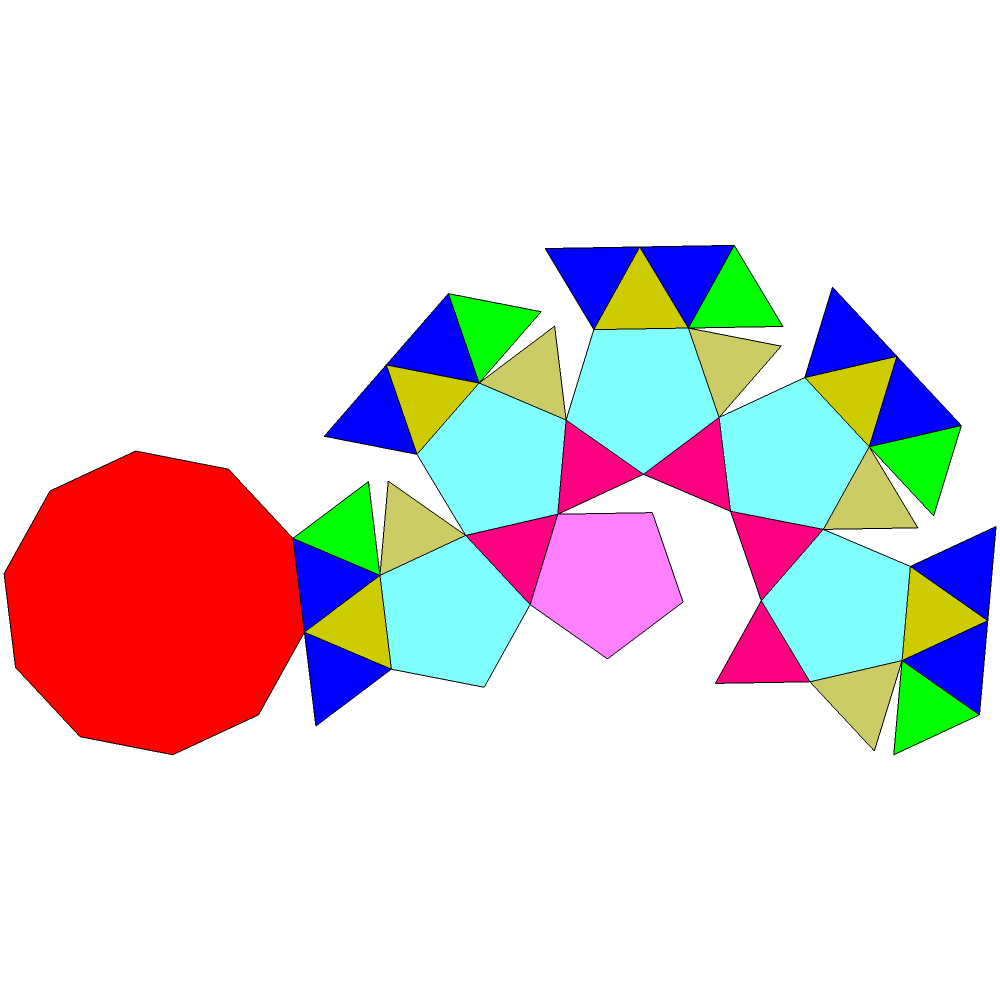

In geometry, the gyroelongated pentagonal rotunda is a Johnson solid, a convex polyhedron with thirty equilateral triangles, six regular pentagons, and one regular decagon as its faces.

== Construction ==
To construct, begin by attaching the pentagonal rotunda's base to one of the pentagonal antiprism's decagons. This construction is called gyroelongation. This replaces the decagon with ten equilateral triangles and six regular pentagons from the faces of a pentagonal rotunda. Hence, the faces of such a resulting polyhedron have thirty equilateral triangles, six regular pentagons, and one regular decagon, adding from the faces of a pentagonal antiprism, and the total number of faces is thirty-seven. Because both polyhedra are convex and the faces are regular polygons, the gyroelongated pentagonal rotunda is a Johnson solid, enumerated as 25th Johnson solid $J_{25}$.

From this construction, the gyroelongated pentagonal rotunda is a composite polyhedron.

== Properties ==
3D model of a gyroelongated pentagonal rotunda

A gyroelongated pentagonal rotunda has the same three-dimensional symmetry group as the pentagonal rotunda, namely the cyclic group $C_{5\mathrm{v}}$ of order ten. Its dihedral angle, an angle between two polygonal faces, can be obtained from the dihedral angle of a pentagonal rotunda and of a pentagonal antiprism. There are five distinguishing dihedral angles:

- the two triangle-to-decagon angles are around 142.6° and 158.7°,
- the triangle-to-decagon angle is around 95.2°, from the angle between the triangular faces and the antiprism's base, and
- the two pentagon-to-triangle angles are around 174.4° and 159.2°.

The surface area of a gyroelongated pentagonal rotunda is obtained by adding all of the polygonal faces' areas, and the volume is obtained by summing the volume of a pentagonal rotunda and of a pentagonal antiprism. With edge length $a$, the surface area $A$ and volume $V$ are:
$$\begin{align}
A & = \frac{1}{2}\left( 15\sqrt{3}+\left(5+3\sqrt{5}\right)\sqrt{5+2\sqrt{5}}\right)a^2 \approx 31.007a^2, \\
V &= \left(\frac{45}{12}+\frac{17}{12}\sqrt{5} + \frac{5}{6}\sqrt{2\sqrt{650+290\sqrt{5}}-2\sqrt{5}-2}\right) a^3 \approx 13.667a^3
\end{align}$$

== See also ==
- Gyroelongated pentagonal cupolarotunda, the 47th Johnson solid, built by attaching a pentagonal rotunda and a pentagonal cupola to each base of a pentagonal antiprism
- Gyroelongated pentagonal birotunda, the 48th Johnson solid, built by attaching two pentagonal rotundae to each base of a pentagonal antiprism
