= Elongated pentagonal rotunda =

21st Johnson solid (27 faces)

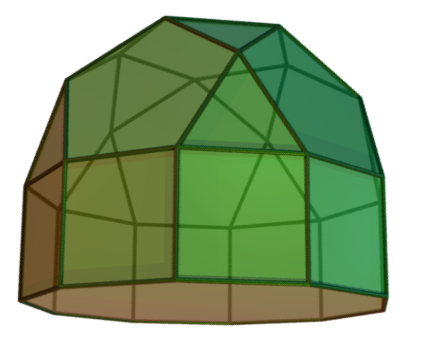
- Type: Johnson; J_{20} – J_{21} – J_{22}
- Faces: 2×5 triangles 2×5 squares 1+5 pentagons 1 decagon
- Edges: 55
- Vertices: 30
- Vertex configuration: 10(4^{2}.10); 10(3.4^{2}.5); 2.5(3.5.3.5)
- Symmetry group: C_{5v}
- Dual polyhedron: -
- Properties: convex

Net
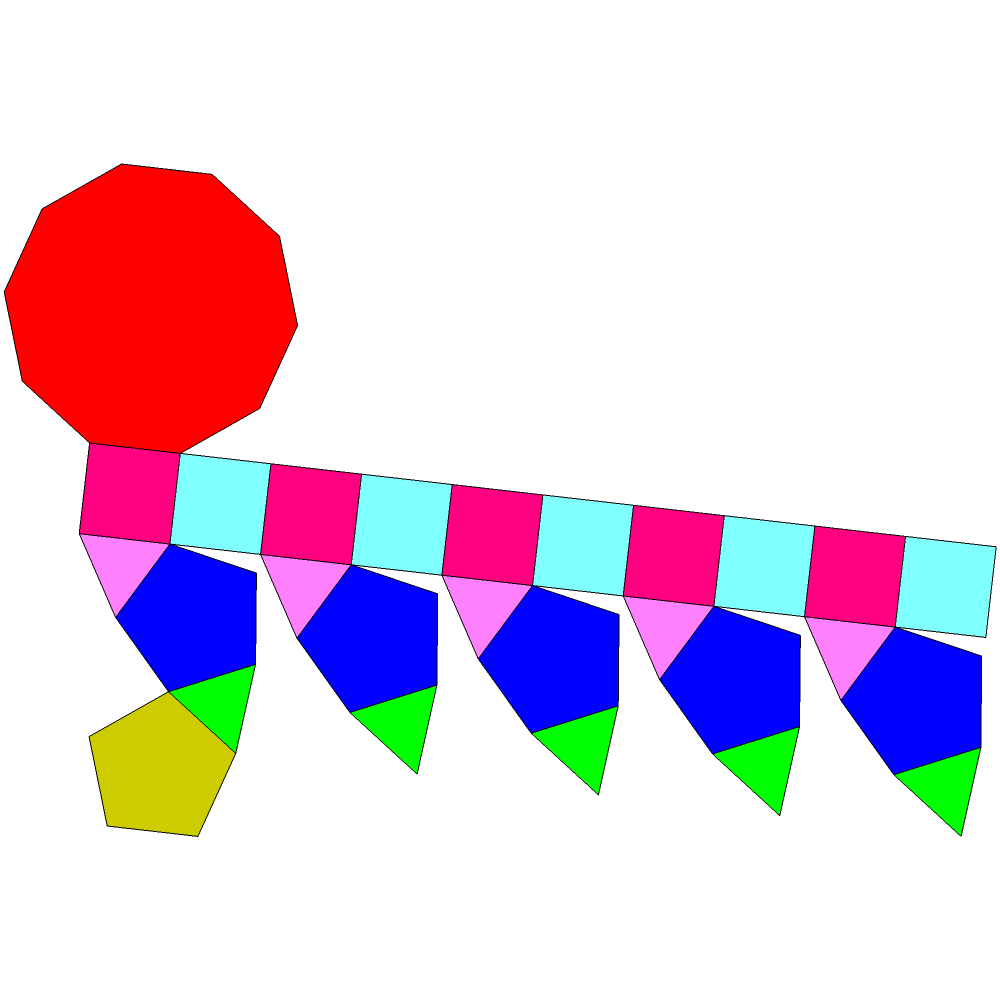

In geometry, the elongated pentagonal rotunda is one of the Johnson solids (J_{21}). As the name suggests, it can be constructed by elongating a pentagonal rotunda (J_{6}) by attaching a decagonal prism to its base. It can also be seen as an elongated pentagonal orthobirotunda (J_{42}) with one pentagonal rotunda removed.

A Johnson solid is one of 92 strictly convex polyhedra that are composed of regular polygon faces but are not uniform polyhedra (that is, they are not Platonic solids, Archimedean solids, prisms, or antiprisms). They were named by Norman Johnson, who first listed these polyhedra in 1966.

3D model of an elongated pentagonal rotunda

== Formulae ==
The following formulae for volume and surface area can be used if all faces are regular, with edge length a:

$V=\frac{1}{12}\left(45+17\sqrt{5}+30\sqrt{5+2\sqrt{5}}\right)a^3\approx14.612...a^3$

$A=\frac{1}{2}\left(20+\sqrt{5\left(145+58\sqrt{5}+2\sqrt{30\left(65+29\sqrt{5}\right)}\right)}\right)a^2\approx32.3472...a^2$

=== Dual polyhedron ===
The dual of the elongated pentagonal rotunda has 30 faces: 10 isosceles triangles, 10 rhombi, and 10 quadrilaterals.

Dual elongated pentagonal rotunda	Net of dual
