= Elongated triangular cupola =

18th Johnson solid (14 faces)

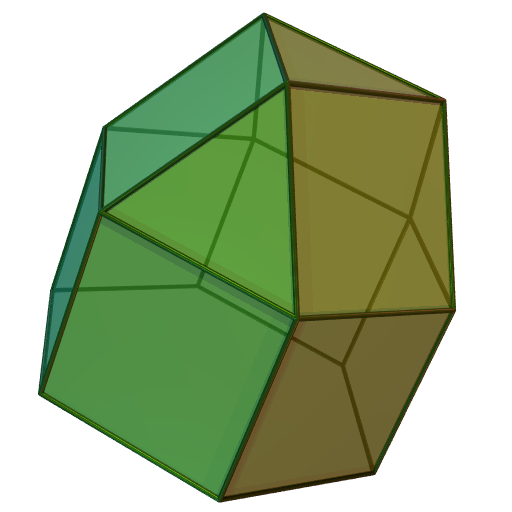
- Type: Johnson; J_{17} – J_{18} – J_{19}
- Faces: 4 triangles 9 squares 1 hexagon
- Edges: 27
- Vertices: 15
- Vertex configuration: 6(4^{2}.6); 3(3.4.3.4); 6(3.4^{3})
- Symmetry group: C_{3v}
- Dual polyhedron: -
- Properties: convex

Net
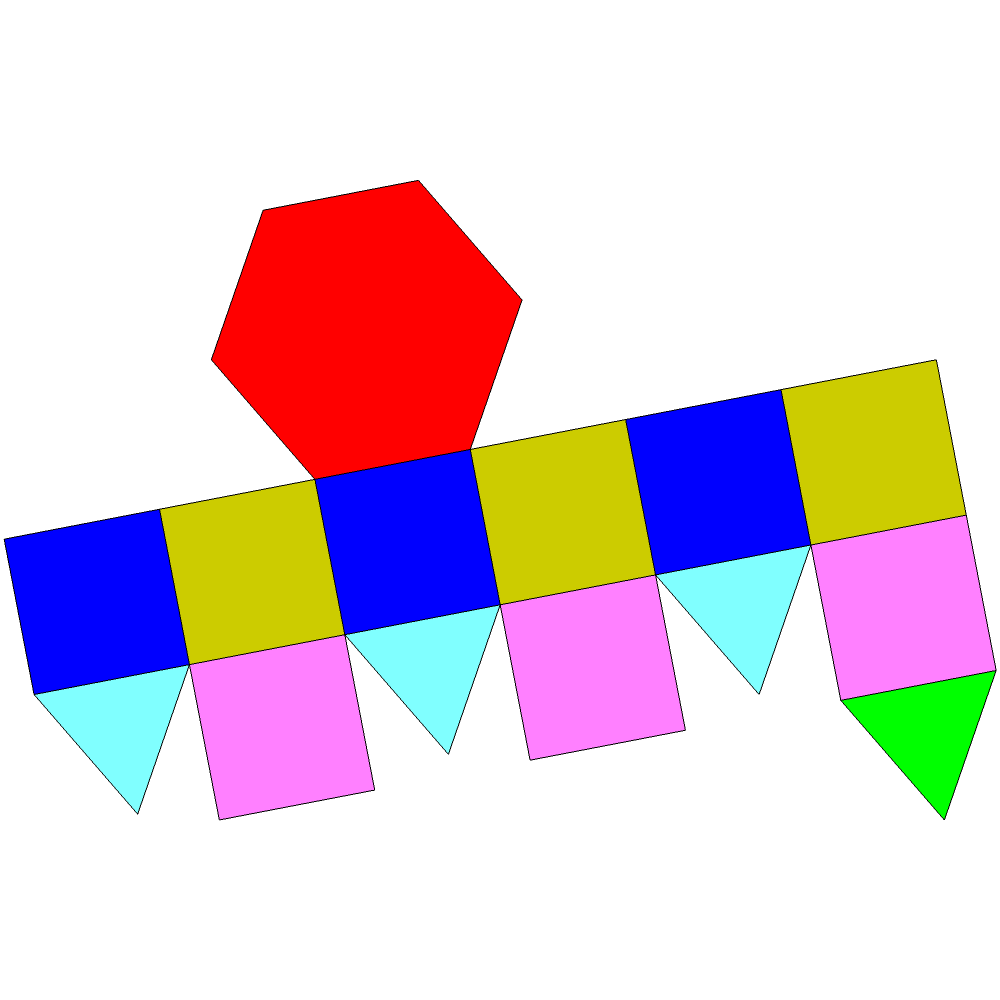

In geometry, the elongated triangular cupola is a polyhedron constructed from a hexagonal prism by attaching a triangular cupola. It is an example of a Johnson solid.

== Construction ==
The elongated triangular cupola is constructed from a hexagonal prism by attaching a triangular cupola onto one of its bases, a process known as the elongation. This cupola covers the hexagonal face so that the resulting polyhedron has four equilateral triangles, nine squares, and one regular hexagon. A convex polyhedron in which all of the faces are regular polygons is the Johnson solid. The elongated triangular cupola is one of them, enumerated as the eighteenth Johnson solid $J_{18}$.

== Properties ==
The surface area of an elongated triangular cupola $A$ is the sum of all polygonal face's area. The volume of an elongated triangular cupola can be ascertained by dissecting it into a cupola and a hexagonal prism, after which summing their volume. Given the edge length $a$, its surface and volume can be formulated as:
$$\begin{align}
A &= \frac{18 + 5\sqrt{3}}{2}a^2 &\approx 13.330a^2, \\
V &= \frac{5\sqrt{2} + 9\sqrt{3}}{6}a^3 &\approx 3.777a^3.
\end{align}$$

3D model of an elongated triangular cupola

It has the same three-dimensional same symmetry as the triangular cupola, the cyclic group $C_{3\mathrm{v}}$ of order 6. Its dihedral angle can be calculated by adding the angle of a triangular cupola and a hexagonal prism:

- the dihedral angle of an elongated triangular cupola between square-to-triangle is that of a triangular cupola between those: 125.3°;
- the dihedral angle of an elongated triangular cupola between two adjacent squares is that of a hexagonal prism, the internal angle of its base 120°;
- the dihedral angle of a hexagonal prism between square-to-hexagon is 90°, that of a triangular cupola between square-to-hexagon is 54.7°, and that of a triangular cupola between triangle-to-hexagonal is an 70.5°. Therefore, the elongated triangular cupola between square-to-square and triangle-to-square, on the edge where a triangular cupola is attached to a hexagonal prism, is 90° + 54.7° = 144.7° and 90° + 70.5° = 166.5° respectively.
