= Sphenomegacorona =

88th Johnson solid (18 faces)

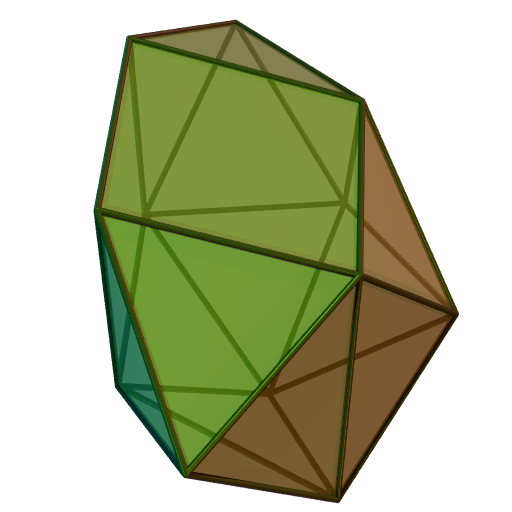
- Type: Johnson; J_{87} – J_{88} – J_{89}
- Faces: 16 triangles 2 squares
- Edges: 28
- Vertices: 12
- Vertex configuration: 2(3^{4}); 2(3^{2}.4^{2}); 2×2(3^{5}); 4(3^{4}.4)
- Symmetry group: C_{2v}
- Dual polyhedron: -
- Properties: convex, elementary

Net
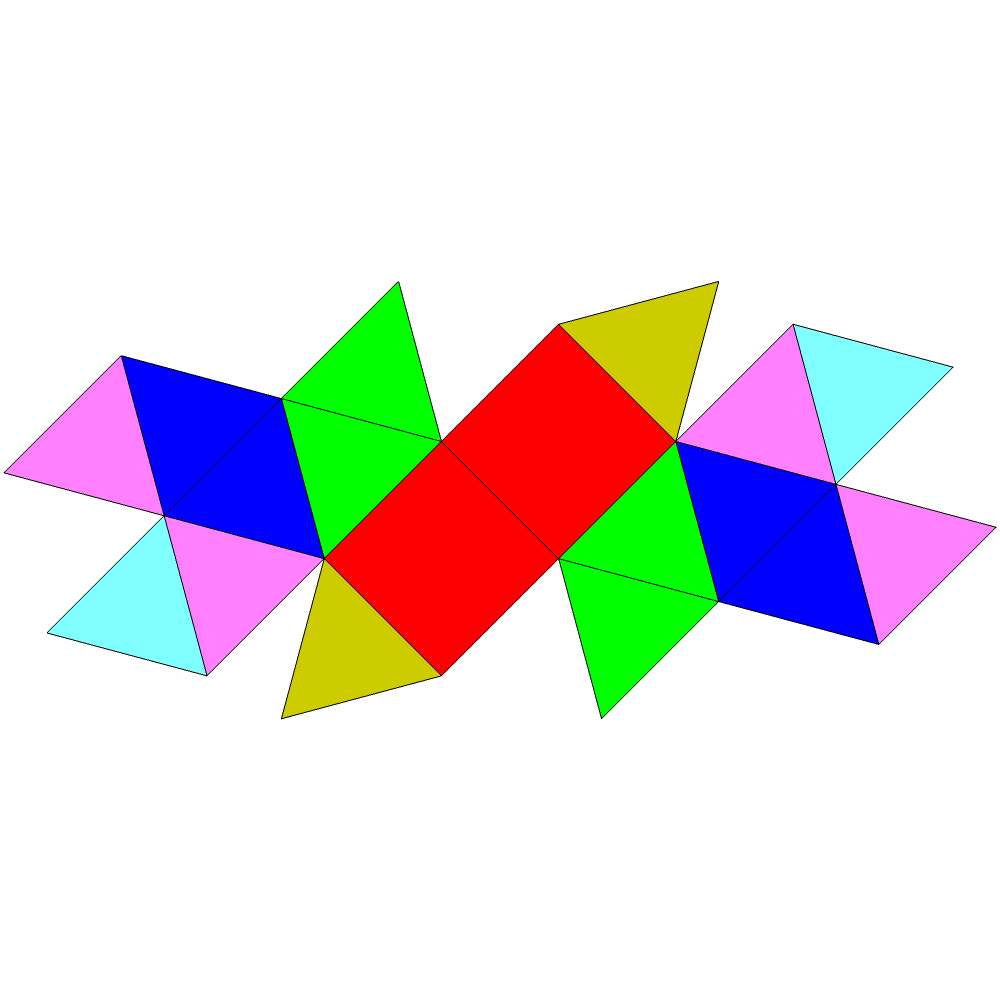

3D model of a sphenomegacorona

In geometry, the sphenomegacorona is a Johnson solid with 16 equilateral triangles and 2 squares as its faces.

== Properties ==
The sphenomegacorona was named by Johnson (1966) in which he used the prefix spheno- referring to a wedge-like complex formed by two adjacent lunes—a square with equilateral triangles attached on its opposite sides. The suffix -megacorona refers to a crownlike complex of 12 triangles, contrasted with the smaller triangular complex that makes the sphenocorona. By joining both complexes, the resulting polyhedron has 16 equilateral triangles and 2 squares, making 18 faces. All of its faces are regular polygons, categorizing the sphenomegacorona as a Johnson solid—a convex polyhedron in which all of the faces are regular polygons—enumerated as the 88th Johnson solid $J_{88}$. It is an elementary polyhedron, meaning it cannot be separated by a plane into two small regular-faced polyhedra.

The surface area of a sphenomegacorona $A$ is the total of polygonal faces' area—16 equilateral triangles and 2 squares. The volume of a sphenomegacorona is obtained by finding the root of a polynomial, and its decimal expansion—denoted as $\xi$—is given by A334114. With edge length $a$, its surface area and volume can be formulated as:
$$\begin{align}
A &= \left(2+4\sqrt{3}\right)a^2 &\approx 8.928a^2, \\
V &= \xi a^3 &\approx 1.948a^3.
\end{align}$$

== Cartesian coordinates ==
Let $k \approx 0.59463$ be the smallest positive root of the polynomial
$$\begin{align} & 1680 x^{16}- 4800 x^{15} - 3712 x^{14} + 17216 x^{13} \\ + & 1568 x^{12} - 24576 x^{11} + 2464 x^{10} + 17248 x^9 \\ - & 3384 x^8 - 5584 x^7 + 2000 x^6+ 240 x^5 \\- & 776 x^4+ 304 x^3 + 200 x^2 - 56 x -23 \end{align}$$
Then, Cartesian coordinates of a sphenomegacorona with edge length 2 are given by the union of the orbits of the points
$$\begin{align} &\left(0,1,2\sqrt{1-k^2}\right),\,(2k,1,0),\,\left(0,\frac{\sqrt{3-4k^2}}{\sqrt{1-k^2}}+1,\frac{1-2k^2}{\sqrt{1-k^2}}\right), \\
&\left(1,0,-\sqrt{2+4k-4k^2}\right),\,\left(0,\frac{\sqrt{3-4k^2}\left(2k^2-1\right)}{\left(k^2-1\right)\sqrt{1-k^2}}+1,\frac{2k^4-1}{\left(1-k^2\right)^\frac32}\right) \end{align}$$
under the action of the group generated by reflections about the xz-plane and the yz-plane.
