= Elongated pentagonal cupola =

Polyhedron with a pentagonal cupola and ten-sided prism

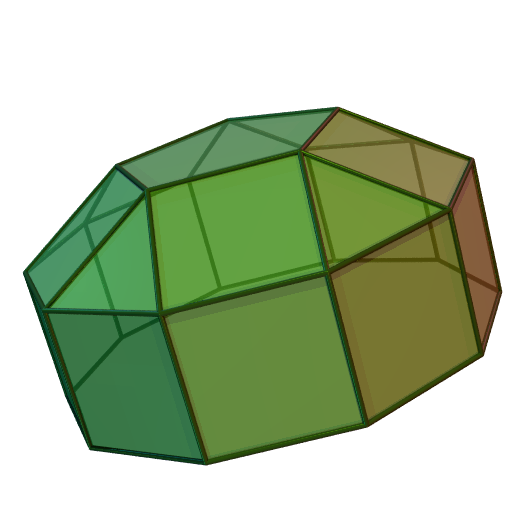
- Type: Johnson; J_{19} – J_{20} – J_{21}
- Faces: 5 triangles 15 squares 1 pentagon 1 decagon
- Edges: 45
- Vertices: 25
- Vertex configuration: 10(4^{2}.10); 10(3.4^{3}); 5(3.4.5.4)
- Symmetry group: C_{5v}
- Properties: convex, composite

Net
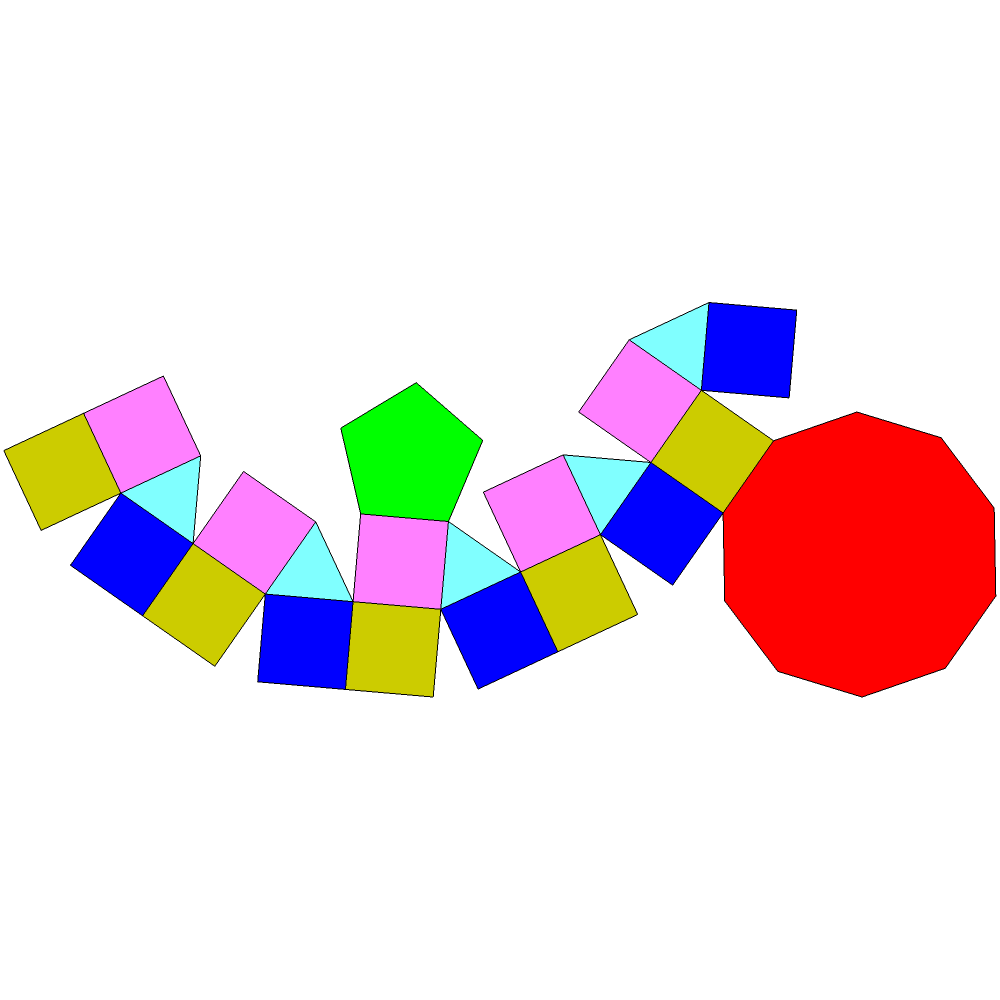

The elongated pentagonal cupola is a polyhedron, constructed by attaching pentagonal cupola to a decagonal prism to its base. It is a Johnson solid.

== Construction ==
The elongated pentagonal cupola is constructed from a ten-sided prism by attaching a pentagonal cupola onto one of its bases, a process known as elongation. This cupola covers one of the prism's two decagons, so that the resulting polyhedron has five equilateral triangles, fifteen squares, one regular pentagon, and one regular decagon. Because of this construction, the elongated pentagonal cupola is composite. A convex polyhedron in which all of the faces are regular polygons is called a Johnson solid. The elongated pentagonal cupola is one of them, enumerated as the twentieth Johnson solid $J_{20}$.

== Properties ==
3D model of an elongated pentagonal cupola

The surface area $A$ of an elongated square cupola is the sum of the areas of all faces: five equilateral triangles, fifteen squares, one regular pentagon, and one regular decagon. Its volume $V$ can be obtained by dissecting it into a pentagonal cupola and a regular decagon, and then adding their volumes. Let $a$ be the edge length of an elongated pentagonal cupola; then its surface area and volume are:
$$\begin{align}
A &= \left(\frac{1}{4}\left(60+\sqrt{10\left(80+31\sqrt{5}+\sqrt{2175+930\sqrt{5}}\right)}\right)\right)a^2 \\
&\approx 26.5797a^2, \\
V &= \left(\frac{1}{6}\left(5+4\sqrt{5}+15\sqrt{5+2\sqrt{5}}\right)\right)a^3 \\
&\approx 10.0183a^3.
\end{align}$$
