= Disphenocingulum =

90th Johnson solid (22 faces)

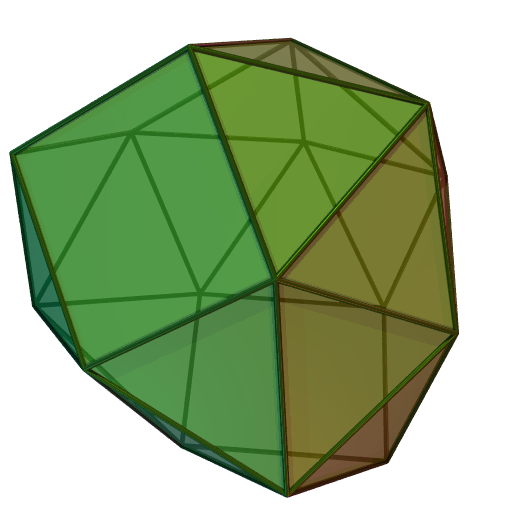
- Type: Johnson; J_{89} – J_{90} – J_{91}
- Faces: 20 triangles 4 squares
- Edges: 38
- Vertices: 16
- Vertex configuration: 4(3^{2}.4^{2}); 4(3^{5}); 8(3^{4}.4)
- Symmetry group: D_{2d}
- Properties: convex, elementary

Net
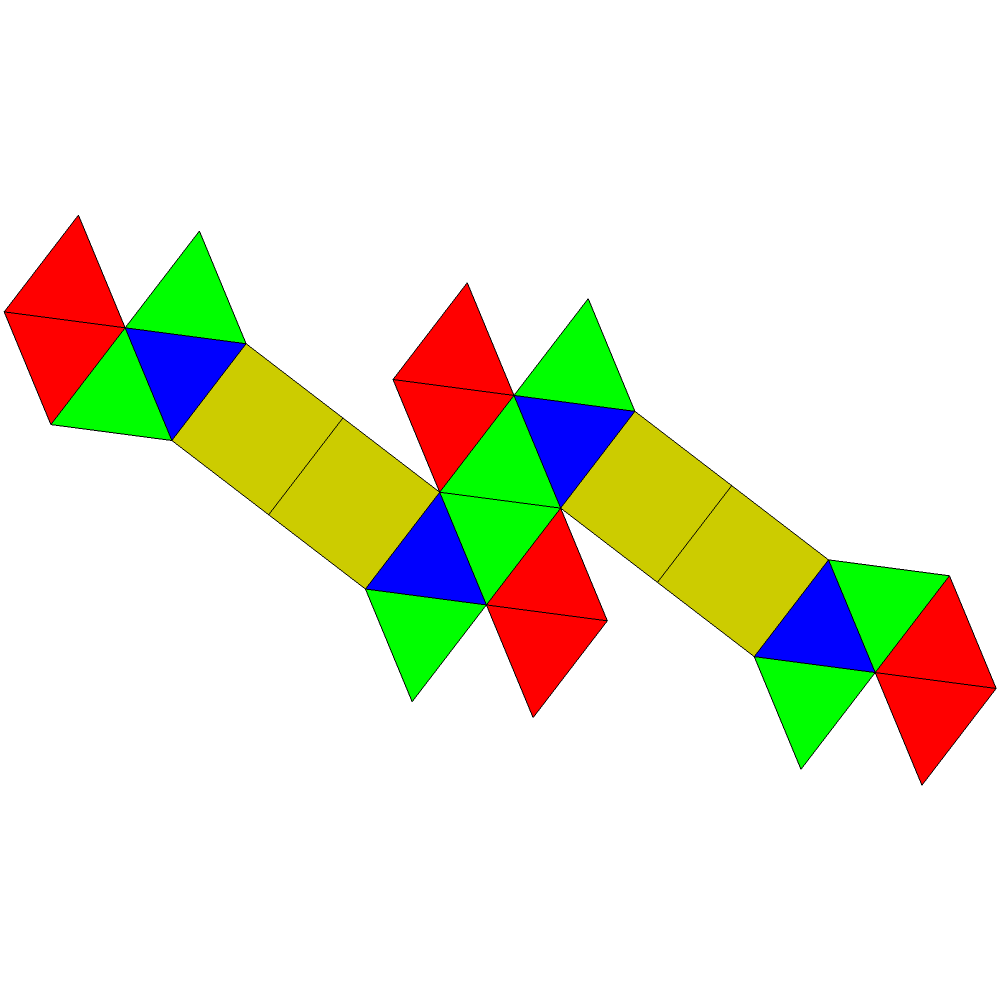

3D model of a disphenocingulum

In geometry, the disphenocingulum is a Johnson solid with 20 equilateral triangles and 4 squares as its faces.

== Properties ==
The disphenocingulum is named by Johnson (1966). The prefix dispheno- refers to two wedgelike complexes, each formed by two adjacent lunes—a figure of two equilateral triangles at the opposite sides of a square. The suffix -cingulum, literally 'belt', refers to a band of 12 triangles joining the two wedges. The resulting polyhedron has 20 equilateral triangles and 4 squares, making 24 faces.. All of the faces are regular, categorizing the disphenocingulum as a Johnson solid—a convex polyhedron in which all of its faces are regular polygon—enumerated as 90th Johnson solid $J_{90}$.. It is an elementary polyhedron, meaning that it cannot be separated by a plane into two small regular-faced polyhedra.

The surface area of a disphenocingulum with edge length $a$ can be determined by adding all of its faces, the area of 20 equilateral triangles and 4 squares $(4 + 5\sqrt{3})a^2 \approx 12.6603a^2$, and its volume is $3.7776a^3$.

== Cartesian coordinates ==
Let $a \approx 0.76713$ be the second smallest positive root of the polynomial
$$\begin{align} &256x^{12} - 512x^{11} - 1664x^{10} + 3712x^9 + 1552x^8 - 6592x^7 \\ &\quad{} + 1248x^6 + 4352x^5 - 2024x^4 - 944x^3 + 672x^2 - 24x - 23 \end{align}$$
and $h = \sqrt{2+8a-8a^2}$ and $c = \sqrt{1-a^2}$. Then, the Cartesian coordinates of a disphenocingulum with edge length 2 are given by the union of the orbits of the points
$$\left(1,2a,\frac{h}{2}\right),\ \left(1,0,2c+\frac{h}{2}\right),\ \left(1+\frac{\sqrt{3-4a^2}}{c},0,2c-\frac{1}{c}+\frac{h}{2}\right)$$
under the action of the group generated by reflections about the xz-plane and the yz-plane.
