= Gyroelongated square bicupola =

45th Johnson solid (34 faces)

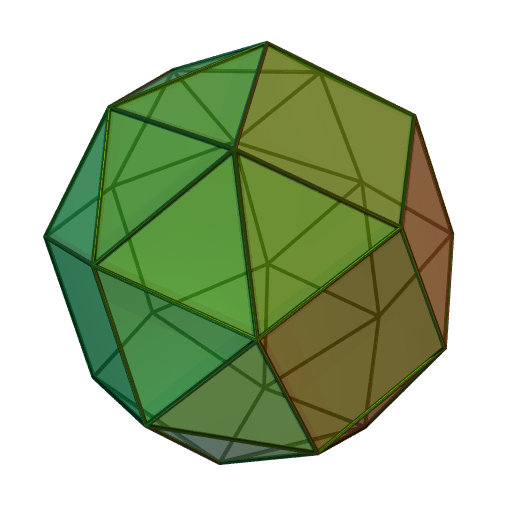
- Type: Johnson; J_{44} – J_{45} – J_{46}
- Faces: 24 triangles 10 squares
- Edges: 56
- Vertices: 24
- Vertex configuration: $8 \times (3 \times 4^3) + 2 \times 8 \times (3^4 \times 4)$
- Symmetry group: $D_4$
- Properties: convex, chiral

Net
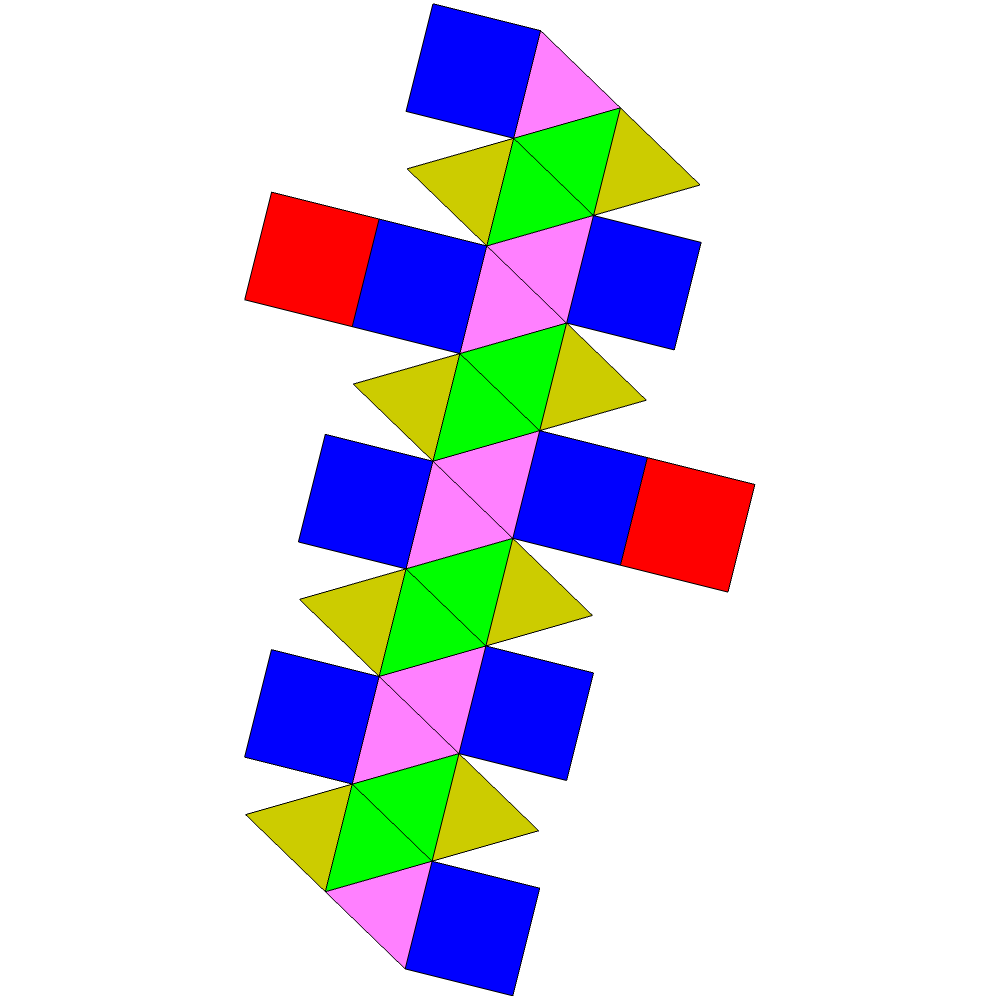

In geometry, the gyroelongated square bicupola is the Johnson solid constructed by attaching two square cupolae on each base of octagonal antiprism. It has the property of chirality.

3D model of a gyroelongated square bicupola

== Construction ==
The gyroelongated square bicupola is constructed by attaching two square cupolae on each base of octagonal antiprism, a process known as gyroelongation. This construction involves the removal of octagons, and replacing them with cupolae. As a result, this polyhedron has twenty-four triangular and ten square faces. The Johnson solid is the convex polyhedron with all of its faces regular, and the gyroelongated square bicupola is one of them, enumerated as $J_{45}$.

== Properties ==
Given that the edge length $a$, the surface area is:
$$\left(10+6\sqrt{3}\right) a^2 \approx 20.392a^2,$$
the total area of twenty equilateral triangles and ten squares. Its volume is:
$$\left(2+\frac{4}{3}\sqrt{2} + \frac{2}{3}\sqrt{4+2\sqrt{2}+2\sqrt{146+103\sqrt{2}}}\right) a^3 \approx 8.154a^3,$$
the total volume of two square cupolae and an octagonal antiprism. Its dihedral angles can be calculated by adding the components of cupolae and antiprism. The dihedral angle of antiprism between two adjacent triangles is approximately $153.9^\circ$. The dihedral angle of each cupola between two squares is $135^\circ$, and that between triangle and square is $144.7^\circ$. The dihedral angle of the cupolae and antiprism between two adjacent triangles and triangle-square is $151.3^\circ$ and $141.6^\circ$, respectively.

The gyroelongated square bicupola is one of five Johnson solids, which is chiral, meaning that they have a "left-handed" and a "right-handed" form. In the following illustration, each square face on the left half of the figure is connected by a path of two triangular faces to a square face below it and on the left. In the figure of opposite chirality (the mirror image of the illustrated figure), each square on the left would be connected to a square face above it and on the right. These two chiral forms are not considered different Johnson solids. It has the symmetry of dihedral group $D_4$.
