= Gyroelongated bicupola =

Set of gyroelongated bicupolae
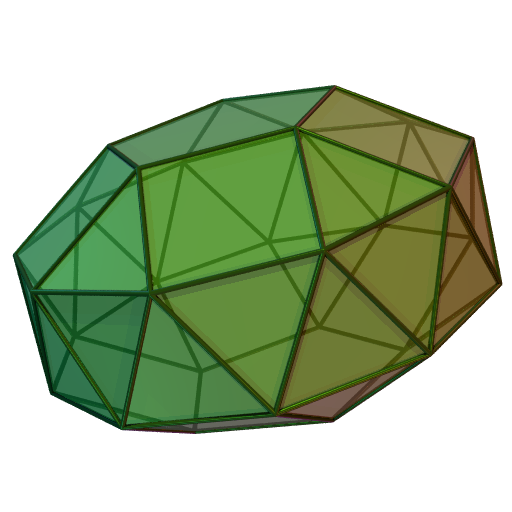
- Example of pentagonal dextro (right-handed) form
- Faces: 6n triangles 2n squares 2 n-gons
- Edges: 16n
- Vertices: 6n
- Symmetry group: D_{n}, [n,2]^{+}, (n22)
- Rotation group: D_{n}, [n,2]^{+}, (n22)
- Properties: convex, chiral

In geometry, the gyroelongated bicupolae are an infinite sets of polyhedra, constructed by adjoining two n-gonal cupolas to an n-gonal antiprism. The triangular, square, and pentagonal gyroelongated bicupola are three of five Johnson solids which are chiral, meaning that they have a "left-handed" and a "right-handed" form.

Adjoining two triangular prisms to a square antiprism also generates a polyhedron, but not a Johnson solid, as it is not convex. The hexagonal form is also a polygon, but has coplanar faces. Higher forms can be constructed without regular faces.

Image cw laevo	Image ccw dextro	Name	Faces
		Gyroelongated digonal bicupola	12 triangles, 4 squares
		Gyroelongated triangular bicupola (J44)	18+2 triangles, 6 squares
		Gyroelongated square bicupola (J45)	24 triangles, 8+2 squares
		Gyroelongated pentagonal bicupola (J46)	30 triangles, 10 squares, 2 pentagons
		Gyroelongated hexagonal bicupola	36 triangles, 12 squares, 2 hexagons

== See also ==
- Elongated cupola
- Gyroelongated cupola
- Bicupola
- Elongated bicupola
- Rotunda
