= Elongated bicupola =

Set of elongated bicupolae
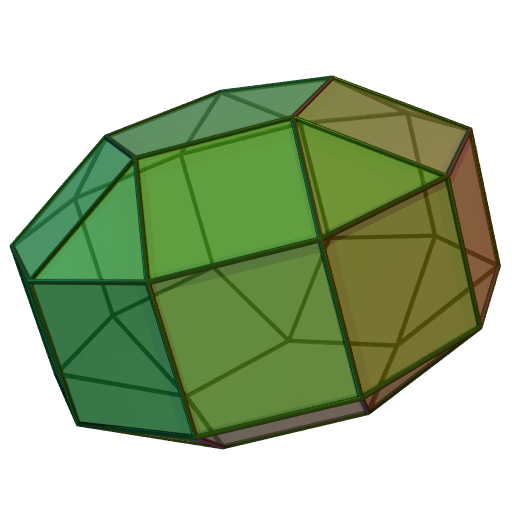
- Example of pentagonal ortho form
- Faces: 2n triangles 4n squares 2 n-gons
- Edges: 12n
- Vertices: 6n
- Symmetry group: Ortho: D_{nh}, [2,n], (*n22), order 4n Gyro: D_{nd}, [2^{+},2n], (2*n), order 4n
- Properties: convex

In geometry, the elongated bicupolae are two infinite sets of polyhedra, constructed by adjoining two n-gonal cupolas to an n-gonal prism. They have 2n triangles, 4n squares, and 2 n-gons. The ortho forms have the cupola aligned, while gyro forms are counter aligned.

3	4	5
Elongated orthobicupola
J35	Semiregular	J38
Elongated triangular orthobicupola	Elongated square orthobicupola (rhombicuboctahedron)	Elongated pentagonal orthobicupola
Elongated gyrobicupola
J36	J37	J39
Elongated triangular gyrobicupola	Elongated square gyrobicupola (pseudorhombicuboctahedron)	Elongated pentagonal gyrobicupola

== See also ==
- Elongated cupola
- Gyroelongated cupola
- Bicupola
- Gyroelongated bicupola
- Rotunda
