= Birotunda =

Solid made from 2 rotunda joined base-to-base

Set of birotundae
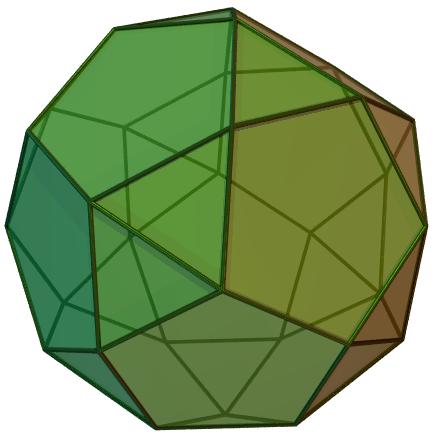
- Example: pentagonal orthobirotunda
- Faces: 2 n-gons 2n pentagons 4n triangles
- Edges: 12n
- Vertices: 6n
- Symmetry group: Ortho: D_{nh}, [n,2], (*n22), order 4n Gyro: D_{nd}, [2n,2^{+}], (2*n), order 4n
- Rotation group: D_{n}, [n,2]^{+}, (n22), order 2n
- Properties: convex

In geometry, a birotunda is any member of a family of dihedral-symmetric polyhedra, formed from two rotunda adjoined through the largest face. They are similar to a bicupola but instead of alternating squares and triangles, it alternates pentagons and triangles around an axis. There are two forms, ortho- and gyro-: an orthobirotunda has one of the two rotundas is placed as the mirror reflection of the other, while in a gyrobirotunda one rotunda is twisted relative to the other.

The pentagonal birotundas can be formed with regular faces, one a Johnson solid, the other a semiregular polyhedron:

- pentagonal orthobirotunda,
- pentagonal gyrobirotunda, which is also called an icosidodecahedron.

Other forms can be generated with dihedral symmetry and distorted equilateral pentagons.

== Examples ==
Birotundas
4	5	6	7	8
square orthobirotunda	pentagonal orthobirotunda	hexagonal orthobirotunda	heptagonal orthobirotunda	octagonal orthobirotunda
square gyrobirotunda	pentagonal gyrobirotunda (icosidodecahedron)	hexagonal gyrobirotunda	heptagonal gyrobirotunda	octagonal gyrobirotunda

== See also ==
- Gyroelongated pentagonal birotunda
- Elongated pentagonal orthobirotunda
- Elongated pentagonal gyrobirotunda
