= Gyroelongated cupola =

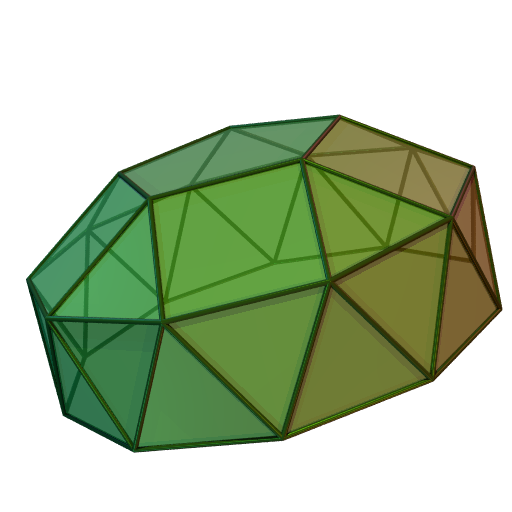
Set of gyroelongated cupolae
Example of a pentagonal form
Faces	5n triangles n squares 1 n-gon 1 2n-gon
Edges	11n
Vertices	5n
Symmetry group	C_{nv}, [n], (*nn)
Rotational group	C_{n}, [n]^{+}, (nn)
Dual polyhedron
Properties	convex

In geometry, the gyroelongated cupolae are an infinite set of polyhedra, constructed by adjoining an n-gonal cupola to a 2n-gonal antiprism.

There are three gyroelongated cupolae that are Johnson solids made from regular triangles, squares, and pentagons. Higher forms can be constructed with isosceles triangles. Adjoining a triangular prism to a square antiprism also generates a polyhedron, but has adjacent parallel faces, so is not a Johnson solid. The hexagonal form can be constructed from regular polygons, but the cupola faces are all in the same plane. Topologically other forms can be constructed without regular faces.

== Forms ==
name	faces
gyroelongated digonal cupola	10 triangles, 2+1 squares
gyroelongated triangular cupola (J22)	15+1 triangles, 3 squares, 1 hexagon
gyroelongated square cupola (J23)	20 triangles, 4+1 squares, 1 octagon
gyroelongated pentagonal cupola (J24)	25 triangles, 5 squares, 1 pentagon, 1 decagon
gyroelongated hexagonal cupola	30 triangles, 6 squares, 1 hexagon, 1 dodecagon

== See also ==
- Bicupola
- Elongated cupola
- Elongated bicupola
- Gyroelongated bicupola
- Rotunda
