= Pentagonal rotunda =

6th Johnson solid (17 faces)

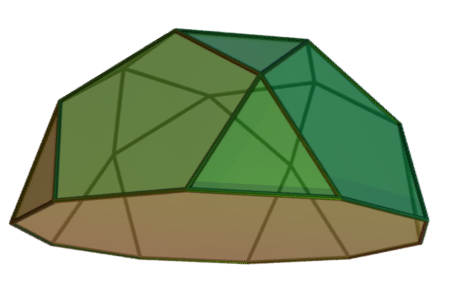
- Type: Johnson; J_{5} – J_{6} – J_{7}
- Faces: 10 triangles 1+5 pentagons 1 decagon
- Edges: 35
- Vertices: 20
- Vertex configuration: 2.5(3.5.3.5); 10(3.5.10)
- Properties: convex, elementary

Net

The pentagonal rotunda is a convex polyhedron with regular polygonal faces. These faces comprise ten equilateral triangles, six regular pentagons, and one regular decagon, making a total of seventeen. The pentagonal rotunda is an example of Johnson solid, enumerated as the sixth Johnson solid $J_6$. It is another example of an elementary polyhedron because by slicing it with a plane, the resulting smaller convex polyhedra do not have regular faces.

The pentagonal rotunda can be regarded as half of an icosidodecahedron, an Archimedean solid, or as half of a pentagonal orthobirotunda, another Johnson solid. Both polyhedra are constructed by attaching two pentagonal rotundas base-to-base. The difference is one of the pentagonal rotundas is twisted. Other Johnson solids constructed by attaching to the base of a pentagonal rotunda are elongated pentagonal rotunda, gyroelongated pentagonal rotunda, pentagonal orthocupolarotunda, pentagonal gyrocupolarotunda, elongated pentagonal orthocupolarotunda, elongated pentagonal gyrocupolarotunda, elongated pentagonal orthobirotunda, elongated pentagonal gyrobirotunda, gyroelongated pentagonal cupolarotunda, and gyroelongated pentagonal birotunda.

3D model of a pentagonal rotunda

As an above, the surface area $A$ and volume $V$ of a pentagonal rotunda are the following:
$$\begin{align}
A &= \left(\frac{1}{2}\left(5\sqrt{3}+\sqrt{10\left(65+29\sqrt{5}\right)}\right)\right)a^2 \approx 22.347a^2, \\
V &= \left(\frac{1}{12}\left(45+17\sqrt{5}\right)\right)a^3\approx6.918a^3.
\end{align}$$

A pentagonal rotunda has three-dimensional symmetry group $C_{5\mathrm{v}}$, a cyclic group of order ten. It has three kinds of dihedral angles, angles between two polygonal faces. These angles are the pentagon-to-decagon around 142.6°, the triangle-to-pentagon around 79.2°, and the pentagon-to-decagon around 63.4°.
