= Gyrate bidiminished rhombicosidodecahedron =

82nd Johnson solid (42 faces)

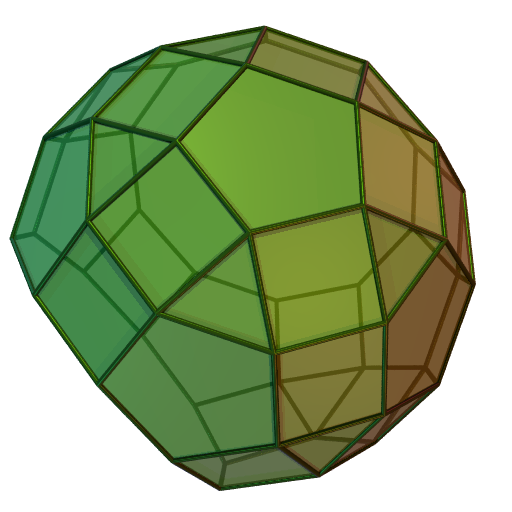
- Type: Johnson; J_{81} – J_{82} – J_{83}
- Faces: 10 triangles 20 squares 10 pentagons 2 decagons
- Edges: 90
- Vertices: 50
- Vertex configuration: 10.2(4.5.10); 5×2(3.4^{2}.5); 4+8.2(3.4.5.4)
- Symmetry group: C_{s}
- Dual polyhedron: -
- Properties: Convex

Net
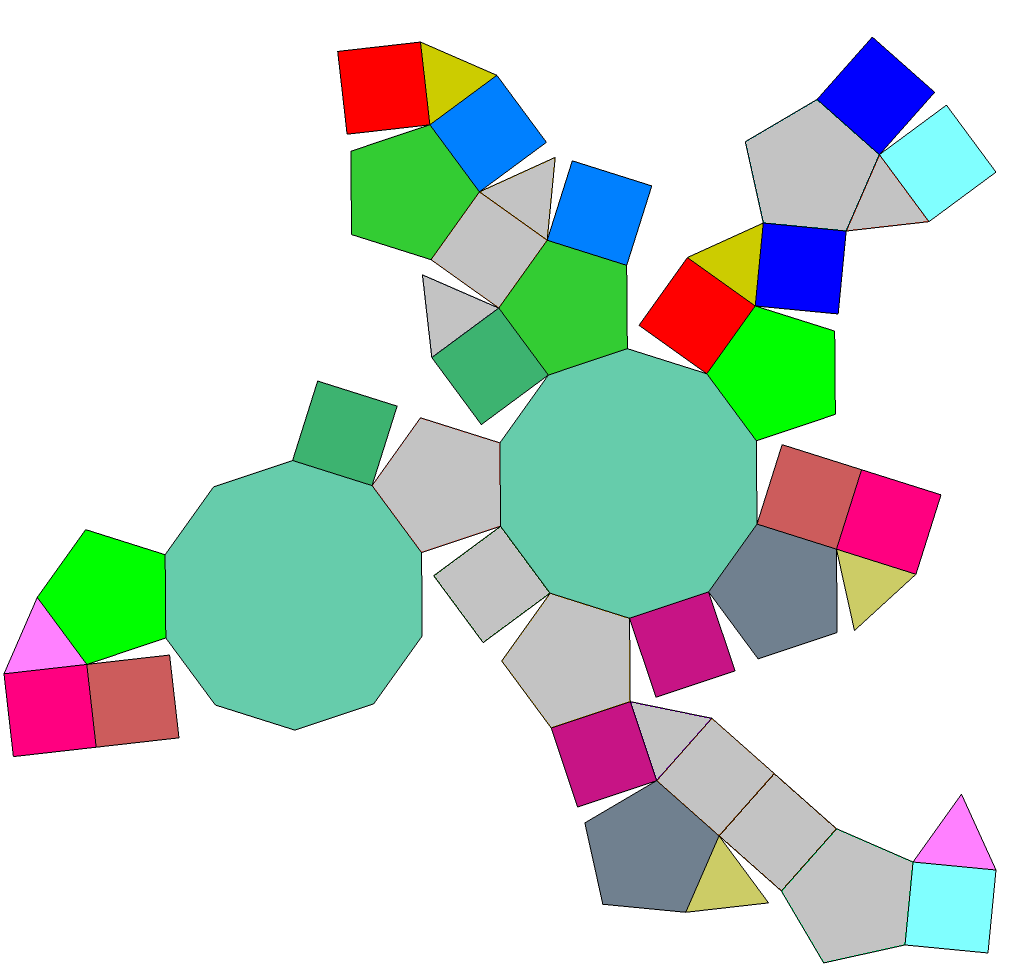

In geometry, the gyrate bidiminished rhombicosidodecahedron is one of the Johnson solids (J_{82}).

3D model of a gyrate bidiminished rhombicosidodecahedron

A Johnson solid is one of 92 strictly convex polyhedra that are composed of regular polygon faces but are not uniform polyhedra (that is, they are not Platonic solids, Archimedean solids, prisms, or antiprisms). They were named by Norman Johnson, who first listed these polyhedra in 1966.

It can be constructed as a rhombicosidodecahedron with two non-opposing pentagonal cupolae (J_{5}) removed and a third is rotated 36 degrees. Related Johnson solids are:

- The diminished rhombicosidodecahedron (J_{76}) where one cupola is removed,
- The parabidiminished rhombicosidodecahedron (J_{80}) where two opposing cupolae are removed,
- The metabidiminished rhombicosidodecahedron (J_{81}) where two non-opposing cupolae are removed,
- And the tridiminished rhombicosidodecahedron (J_{83}) where three cupolae are removed.
