= Pentagonal cupola =

Cupola with decagonal base

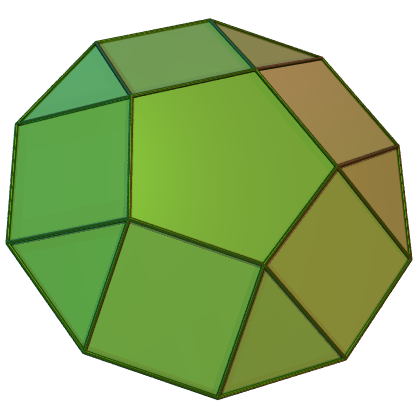
- Type: Johnson; J_{4} – J_{5} – J_{6}
- Faces: 5 triangles 5 squares 1 pentagon 1 decagon
- Edges: 25
- Vertices: 15
- Vertex configuration: $10 \times (3 \times 4 \times 10)$ $5 \times (3 \times 4 \times 5 \times 4)$
- Symmetry group: $C_{\mathrm{v}}$
- Properties: convex, elementary

Net
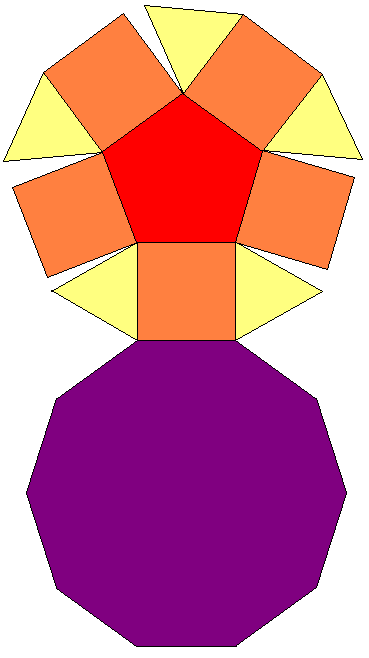

In geometry, the pentagonal cupola is one of the Johnson solids (J_{5}). It can be obtained as a slice of the rhombicosidodecahedron. The pentagonal cupola consists of 5 equilateral triangles, 5 squares, 1 pentagon, and 1 decagon.

== Properties ==
The pentagonal cupola's faces are five equilateral triangles, five squares, one regular pentagon, and one regular decagon. It has the property of convexity and regular polygonal faces, from which it is classified as the fifth Johnson solid. This cupola cannot be sliced by a plane without cutting within a face, so it is an elementary polyhedron.

The following formulae for circumradius $R$, and height $h$, surface area $A$, and volume $V$ may be applied if all faces are regular with edge length $a$:
$$\begin{align}
h &= \sqrt{\frac{5 - \sqrt{5}}{10}}a &\approx 0.526a, \\
R &= \frac{\sqrt{11+4\sqrt{5}}}{2}a &\approx 2.233a, \\
A &= \frac{20+5\sqrt{3}+\sqrt{5\left(145+62\sqrt{5}\right)}}{4}a^2 &\approx 16.580a^2, \\
V &= \frac{5+4\sqrt{5}}{6}a^3 &\approx 2.324a^3.
\end{align}$$

3D model of a pentagonal cupola

It has an axis of symmetry passing through the center of both top and base, which is symmetrical by rotating around it at one-, two-, three-, and four-fifth of a full-turn angle. It is also mirror-symmetric relative to any perpendicular plane passing through a bisector of the hexagonal base. Therefore, it has pyramidal symmetry, the cyclic group $C_{5\mathrm{v}}$ of order ten.

== Related polyhedron ==
The pentagonal cupola can be applied to construct a polyhedron. A construction that involves the attachment of its base to another polyhedron is known as augmentation; attaching it to prisms or antiprisms is known as elongation or gyroelongation. Some of the Johnson solids with such constructions are:

- elongated pentagonal cupola $J_{20}$
- gyroelongated pentagonal cupola $J_{24}$
- pentagonal orthobicupola $J_{30}$
- pentagonal gyrobicupola $J_{31}$
- pentagonal orthocupolarotunda $J_{32}$
- pentagonal gyrocupolarotunda $J_{33}$
- elongated pentagonal orthobicupola $J_{38}$
- elongated pentagonal gyrobicupola $J_{39}$
- elongated pentagonal orthocupolarotunda $J_{40}$
- gyroelongated pentagonal bicupola $J_{46}$
- gyroelongated pentagonal cupolarotunda $J_{47}$
- augmented truncated dodecahedron $J_{68}$
- parabiaugmented truncated dodecahedron $J_{69}$
- metabiaugmented truncated dodecahedron $J_{70}$
- triaugmented truncated dodecahedron $J_{71}$
- gyrate rhombicosidodecahedron $J_{72}$
- parabigyrate rhombicosidodecahedron $J_{73}$
- metabigyrate rhombicosidodecahedron $J_{74}$
- trigyrate rhombicosidodecahedron $J_{75}$

Relatedly, a construction from polyhedra by removing one or more pentagonal cupolas is known as diminishment:

- diminished rhombicosidodecahedron $J_{76}$
- paragyrate diminished rhombicosidodecahedron $J_{77}$
- metagyrate diminished rhombicosidodecahedron $J_{78}$
- bigyrate diminished rhombicosidodecahedron $J_{79}$
- parabidiminished rhombicosidodecahedron $J_{80}$
- metabidiminished rhombicosidodecahedron $J_{81}$
- gyrate bidiminished rhombicosidodecahedron $J_{82}$
- tridiminished rhombicosidodecahedron $J_{83}$
