= J40 =

J40 may refer to:

- County Route J40 (California)
- Elongated pentagonal orthocupolarotunda, a Johnson solid (J_{40})
- HMS Fermoy (J40), a Hunt-class minesweeper of the Royal Navy
- Toyota Land Cruiser (J40), a Japanese off-road vehicle
- Westinghouse J40, an American turbojet engine
