= J44 =

J44 may refer to:

- County Route J44 (California)
- Fairchild J44, a turbojet engine
- Gyroelongated triangular bicupola
