= J46 =

J46 may refer to:

- County Route J46 (California)
- Gyroelongated pentagonal bicupola
- Westinghouse J46, a turbojet engine
