= Elongated pentagonal gyrocupolarotunda =

41st Johnson solid (37 faces)

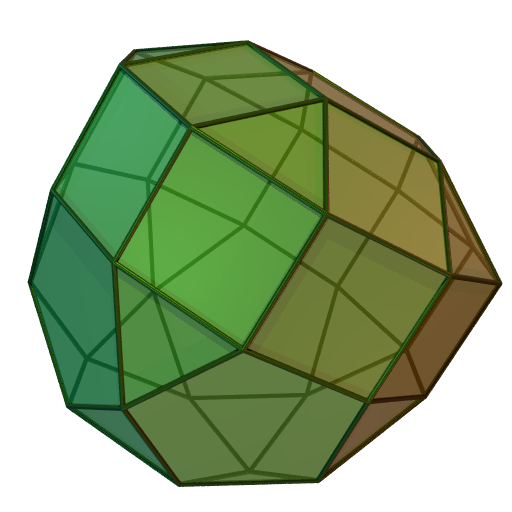
- Type: Johnson; J_{40} – J_{41} – J_{42}
- Faces: 3×5 triangles 3×5 squares 2+5 pentagons
- Edges: 70
- Vertices: 35
- Vertex configuration: 10(3.4^{3}); 10(3.4^{2}.5); 5(3.4.5.4); 2.5(3.5.3.5)
- Symmetry group: C_{5v}
- Dual polyhedron: -
- Properties: convex

Net
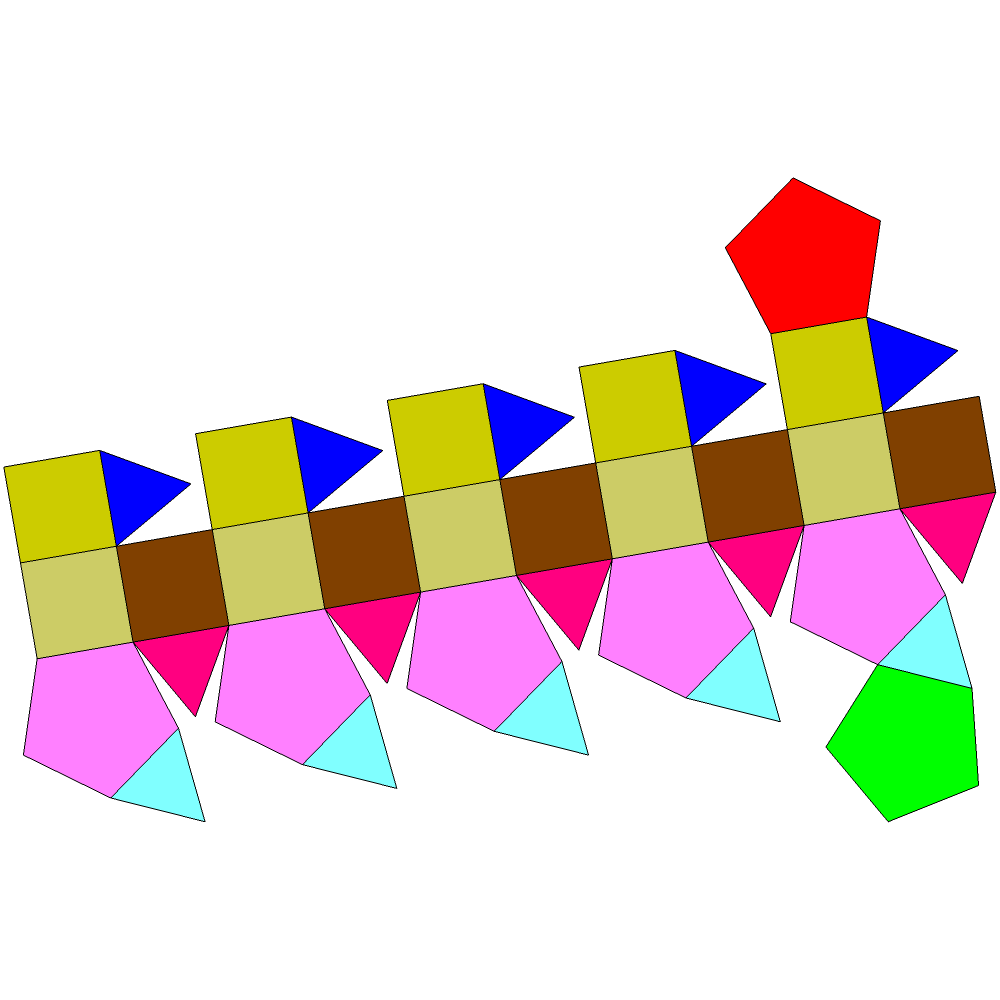

In geometry, the elongated pentagonal gyrocupolarotunda is one of the Johnson solids (J_{41}). As the name suggests, it can be constructed by elongating a pentagonal gyrocupolarotunda (J_{33}) by inserting a decagonal prism between its halves. Rotating either the pentagonal cupola (J_{5}) or the pentagonal rotunda (J_{6}) through 36 degrees before inserting the prism yields an elongated pentagonal orthocupolarotunda (J_{40}).

A Johnson solid is one of 92 strictly convex polyhedra that is composed of regular polygon faces but are not uniform polyhedra (that is, they are not Platonic solids, Archimedean solids, prisms, or antiprisms). They were named by Norman Johnson, who first listed these polyhedra in 1966.

3D model of an elongated pentagonal gyrocupolarotunda

== Formulae ==
The following formulae for volume and surface area can be used if all faces are regular, with edge length a:

$$V=\frac{5}{12}\left(11+5\sqrt{5}+6\sqrt{5+2\sqrt{5}}\right)a^3\approx16.936...a^3$$

$$A=\frac{1}{4}\left(60+\sqrt{10\left(190+49\sqrt{5}+21\sqrt{75+30\sqrt{5}}\right)}\right)a^2\approx33.5385...a^2$$
