= J42 =

J42 may refer to:

- County Route J42 (California)
- Elongated pentagonal orthobirotunda, a Johnson solid (J_{42})
- HMS Halcyon (J42), a minesweeper of the Royal Navy
- Pratt & Whitney J42, a turbojet engine
- Tracheitis
