= J36 =

J36 may refer to:

- Allis-Chalmers J36, an American version of the de Havilland Goblin jet engine
- County Route J36 (California)
- Chengdu J-36, a Chinese fighter jet
- Elongated triangular gyrobicupola, a Johnson solid (J_{36})
- HMS Rhyl (J36), a Bangor-class minesweeper of the Royal Navy
- LNER Class J36, a British steam locomotive class
- Peritonsillar abscess
