= Elongated cupola =

Set of elongated cupolae
Elongated pentagonal cupola
Faces	n triangles 3n squares 1 n-gon 1 2n-gon
Edges	9n
Vertices	5n
Symmetry group	C_{nv}, [n], (*nn)
Rotational group	C_{n}, [n]^{+}, (nn)
Dual polyhedron	
Properties	convex

In geometry, the elongated cupolae are an infinite set of polyhedra, constructed by adjoining an n-gonal cupola to a 2n-gonal prism.

There are three elongated cupolae that are Johnson solids made from regular triangles, squares, and pentagons. Higher forms can be constructed with isosceles triangles. Adjoining a triangular prism to a cube also generates a polyhedron, but has two pairs of coplanar faces, so is not a Johnson solid. Higher forms can be constructed without regular faces.

== Forms ==
name	faces
elongated digonal cupola	2 triangles, 6+1 squares
elongated triangular cupola (J18)	3+1 triangles, 9 squares, 1 hexagon
elongated square cupola (J19)	4 triangles, 12+1 squares, 1 octagon
elongated pentagonal cupola (J20)	5 triangles, 15 squares, 1 pentagon, 1 decagon
elongated hexagonal cupola	6 triangles, 18 squares, 1 hexagon, 1 dodecagon

== See also ==
- Gyroelongated cupola
- Bicupola
- Elongated bicupola
- Gyroelongated bicupola
- Rotunda
