= J48 =

J48 may refer to:

- Gyroelongated pentagonal birotunda
- HMS Medway Queen (J48), a paddle steamer of the Royal Navy
- Pratt & Whitney J48, a turbojet engine
- J48, an implementation of the C4.5 algorithm
