= J43 =

J43 may refer to:

- Elongated pentagonal gyrobirotunda
- Malaysia Federal Route J43
- Oukaïmeden Observatory, in Morocco
