= J41 =

J41 may refer to:

- British Aerospace Jetstream J41, a British airliner
- County Route J41 (California)
- Elongated pentagonal gyrocupolarotunda, a Johnson solid (J_{41})
