= Triangular cupola =

Cupola with hexagonal base

- Type: Johnson; J_{2} – J_{3} – J_{4}
- Faces: 4 triangles 3 squares 1 hexagon
- Edges: 15
- Vertices: 9
- Vertex configuration: $$\begin{align} &6 \times (3 \times 4 \times 6) \, + \\ &3 \times (3 \times 4 \times 3 \times 4) \end{align}$$
- Symmetry group: $C_{3v}$
- Properties: convex

Net

In geometry, the triangular cupola is the cupola with hexagon as its base and triangle as its top. If the edges are equal in length, the triangular cupola is a Johnson solid. It can be seen as half a cuboctahedron. The triangular cupola can be applied to construct many polyhedrons.

== Properties ==
The triangular cupola has four triangles, three squares, and one hexagon as its faces; the hexagon is the base, and one of the four triangles is the top. If all of the edges are equal in length, the triangles and the hexagon become regular. Such a triangular cupola has three dihedral angles: an angle between each triangle and the hexagon is approximately 70.5°, an angle hat between each square and the hexagon is 54.7°, and an angle between square and triangle is 125.3°. The triangular cupola is a Johnson solid, named after American mathematician Norman Johnson, who listed the convex polyhedra with regular polygonal faces. In the list, the triangular cupola is enumerated as the third Johnson solid $J_{3}$. It is an elementary polyhedron, meaning that it cannot produce any convex, regular-faced polyhedron after being sliced by a plane.

For a triangular cupola with edge length $a$, its surface area $A$ can be calculated by adding the area of four equilateral triangles, three squares, and one hexagon:
$$A = \left(3+\frac{5\sqrt{3}}{2} \right) a^2 \approx 7.33a^2.$$
Its height $h$ and volume $V$ are:
$$\begin{align}
h &= \frac{\sqrt{6}}{3} a\approx 0.82a, \\
V &= \left(\frac{5}{3\sqrt{2}}\right)a^3 \approx 1.18a^3.
\end{align}$$

3D model of a triangular cupola

It has a threefold axis of symmetry passing through the center of both top and base. It is also mirror-symmetric relative to any plane containing this axis and a bisector of the triangular base. Therefore, it has pyramidal symmetry, the cyclic group $C_{3\mathrm{v}}$ of order 6.

== Related polyhedra ==
The triangular cupola can be found in the construction of many polyhedra. An example is the cuboctahedron in which the triangular cupola may be considered as its hemisphere. A construction that involves the attachment of its base to another polyhedron is known as augmentation; attaching prisms or antiprisms to it is known as elongation or gyroelongation. Some of the other Johnson solids constructed in such a way are the elongated triangular cupola $J_{18}$, gyroelongated triangular cupola $J_{22}$, triangular orthobicupola $J_{27}$, elongated triangular orthobicupola $J_{35}$, elongated triangular gyrobicupola $J_{36}$, gyroelongated triangular bicupola $J_{44}$, and augmented truncated tetrahedron $J_{65}$.

The triangular cupola may also be used in constructing the truncated tetrahedron, although it leaves some hollows and a regular tetrahedron as its interior. Cundy (1956) constructed such a polyhedron in a way similar to the rhombic dodecahedron by attaching six square pyramids outwards, each of whose apices are in the cube's center. That being said, such truncated tetrahedra are constructed by attaching four triangular cupolas rectangle-by-rectangle; those cupolas in which the alternating sides of both right isosceles triangle and rectangle have the edges in terms of ratio $1 : \frac{1}{2}\sqrt{2}$. The truncated octahedron can be constructed by attaching eight of those same triangular cupolas triangle-by-triangle.
