= Metabidiminished rhombicosidodecahedron =

81st Johnson solid (42 faces)

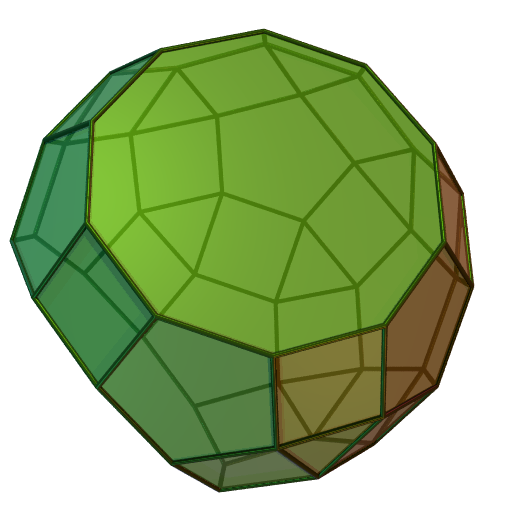
- Type: Johnson; J_{80} – J_{81} – J_{82}
- Faces: 3×2+4 triangles 2+2+4×4 squares 3×2+4 pentagons 2 decagons
- Edges: 90
- Vertices: 50
- Vertex configuration: 5×4(4.5.10); 3×2+6×4(3.4.5.4)
- Symmetry group: C_{2v}
- Dual polyhedron: -
- Properties: Convex

Net
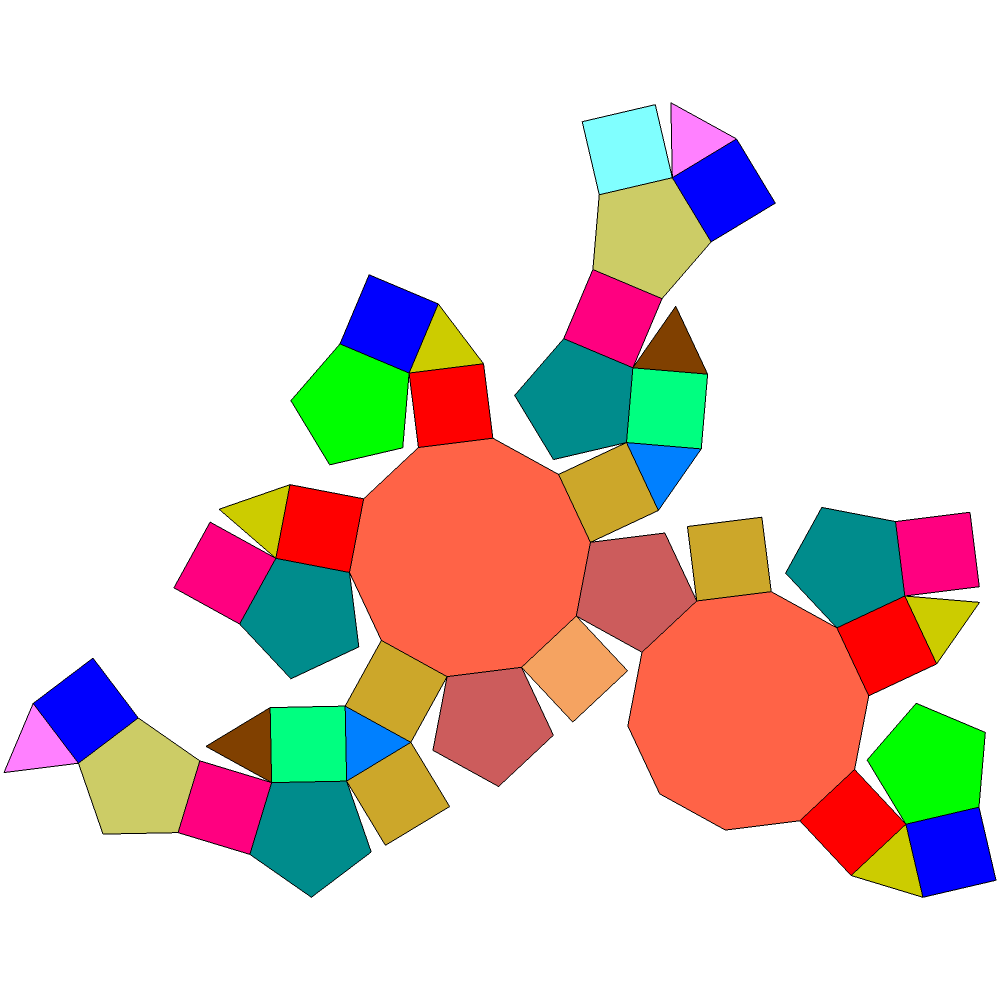

In geometry, the metabidiminished rhombicosidodecahedron is one of the Johnson solids (J_{81}).

3D model of a metabidiminished rhombicosidodecahedron

A Johnson solid is one of 92 strictly convex polyhedra that are composed of regular polygon faces but are not uniform polyhedra (that is, they are not Platonic solids, Archimedean solids, prisms, or antiprisms). They were named by Norman Johnson, who first listed these polyhedra in 1966.

It can be constructed as a rhombicosidodecahedron with two non-opposing pentagonal cupolae (J_{5}) removed. Related Johnson solids are:

- The diminished rhombicosidodecahedron (J_{76}) where one cupola is removed,
- The parabidiminished rhombicosidodecahedron (J_{80}) where two opposing cupolae are removed,
- The gyrate bidiminished rhombicosidodecahedron (J_{82}) where two non-opposing cupolae are removed and a third is rotated 36 degrees,
- The tridiminished rhombicosidodecahedron (J_{83}) where three cupolae are removed.
