= Gyroelongated triangular cupola =

22nd Johnson solid (20 faces)

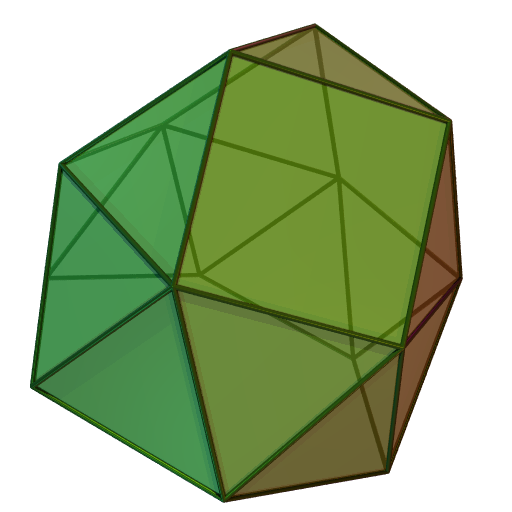
- Type: Johnson; J_{21} – J_{22} – J_{23}
- Faces: 1+3×3+6 triangles 3 squares 1 hexagon
- Edges: 33
- Vertices: 15
- Vertex configuration: 3(3.4.3.4); 2.3(3^{3}.6); 6(3^{4}.4)
- Symmetry group: C_{3v}
- Dual polyhedron: -
- Properties: convex

Net
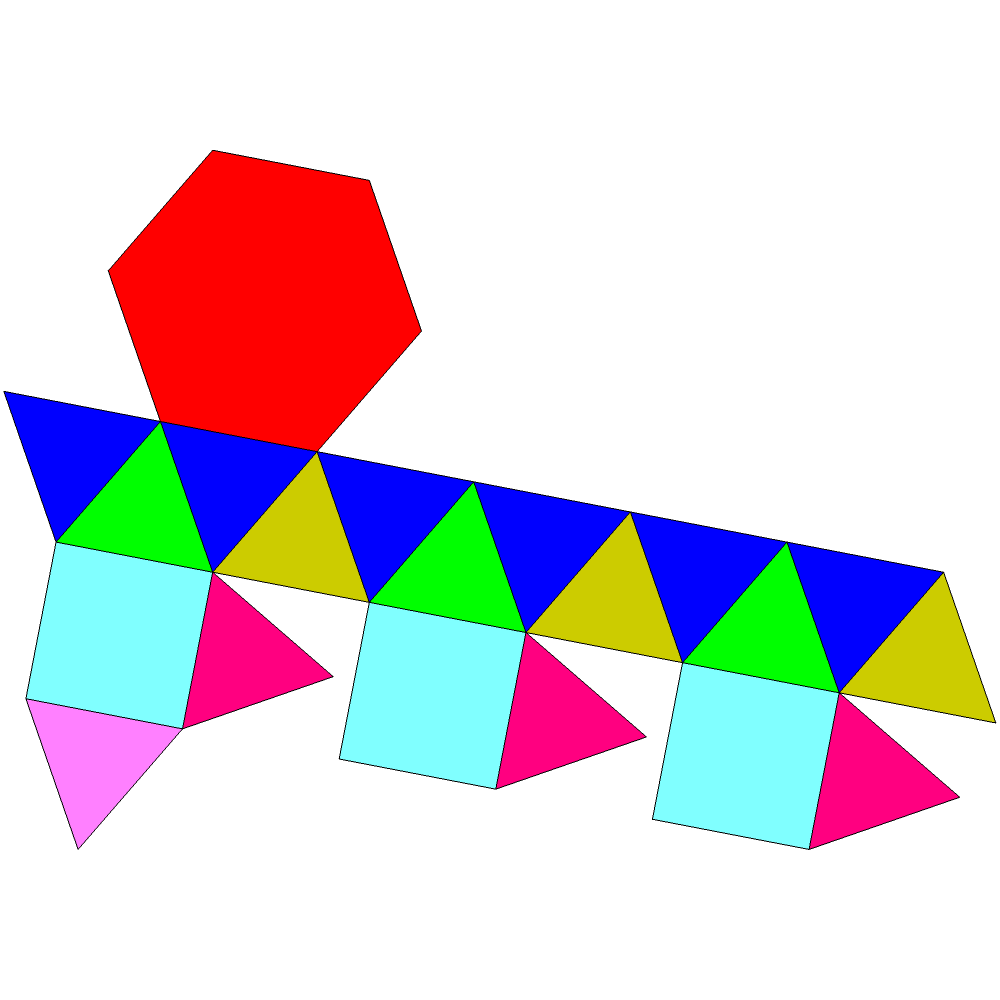

In geometry, the gyroelongated triangular cupola is one of the Johnson solids (J_{22}). It can be constructed by attaching a hexagonal antiprism to the base of a triangular cupola (J_{3}). This is called "gyroelongation", which means that an antiprism is joined to the base of a solid, or between the bases of more than one solid.

The gyroelongated triangular cupola can also be seen as a gyroelongated triangular bicupola (J_{44}) with one triangular cupola removed. Like all cupolae, the base polygon has twice as many sides as the top (in this case, the bottom polygon is a hexagon because the top is a triangle).

A Johnson solid is one of 92 strictly convex polyhedra that is composed of regular polygon faces but are not uniform polyhedra (that is, they are not Platonic solids, Archimedean solids, prisms, or antiprisms). They were named by Norman Johnson, who first listed these polyhedra in 1966.

3D model of a gyroelongated triangular cupola

== Formulae ==
The following formulae for volume and surface area can be used if all faces are regular, with edge length a:

$$V=\left(\frac{1}{3}\sqrt{\frac{61}{2}+18\sqrt{3}+30\sqrt{1+\sqrt{3}}}\right)a^3\approx3.51605...a^3$$

$$A=\left(3+\frac{11\sqrt{3}}{2}\right)a^2\approx12.5263...a^2$$

== Dual polyhedron ==
The dual of the gyroelongated triangular cupola has 15 faces: 6 kites, 3 rhombi, and 6 pentagons.

Dual gyroelongated triangular cupola	Net of dual
