= Bicupola =

Solid made from 2 cupolae joined base-to-base

In geometry, a bicupola is a solid formed by connecting two cupolae on their bases. Here, two classes of bicupola are included because each cupola (bicupola half) is bordered by alternating triangles and squares. If similar faces are attached together the result is an orthobicupola; if squares are attached to triangles it is a gyrobicupola.

== Forms ==
In the first column of the two following tables, the symbols are Schoenflies, Coxeter, and orbifold notation, in this order.

=== Set of orthobicupolae ===
Symmetry	Picture	Description
D_{3h} [2,3] *223		Triangular orthobicupola (J_{27}): 8 triangles, 6 squares. Its dual is the trapezo-rhombic dodecahedron
D_{4h} [2,4] *224		Square orthobicupola (J_{28}): 8 triangles, 10 squares.
D_{5h} [2,5] *225		Pentagonal orthobicupola (J_{30}): 10 triangles, 10 squares, 2 pentagons.
D_{nh} [2,n] *22n		n-gonal orthobicupola: 2n triangles, 2n rectangles, 2 n-gons

=== Set of gyrobicupolae ===
An n-gonal gyrobicupola has the same topology as an n-gonal rectified antiprism, Conway polyhedron notation: aAn.

Symmetry	Picture	Description
D_{2d} [2^{+},4] 2*2		Gyrobifastigium (J_{26}) or digonal gyrobicupola: 4 triangles, 4 squares.
D_{3d} [2^{+},6] 2*3		Triangular gyrobicupola or cuboctahedron: 8 triangles, 6 squares. Its dual is the rhombic dodecahedron.
D_{4d} [2^{+},8] 2*4		Square gyrobicupola (J_{29}): 8 triangles, 10 squares. Its dual is the elongated tetragonal trapezohedron
D_{5d} [2^{+},10] 2*5		Pentagonal gyrobicupola (J_{31}): 10 triangles, 10 squares, 2 pentagons. Its dual is the elongated pentagonal trapezohedron
D_{nd} [2^{+},2n] 2*n		n-gonal gyrobicupola: 2n triangles, 2n rectangles, 2 n-gons.

== See also ==
- Elongated cupola
- Gyroelongated cupola
- Elongated bicupola
- Gyroelongated bicupola
- Rotunda
