= Tridiminished rhombicosidodecahedron =

83rd Johnson solid (32 faces)

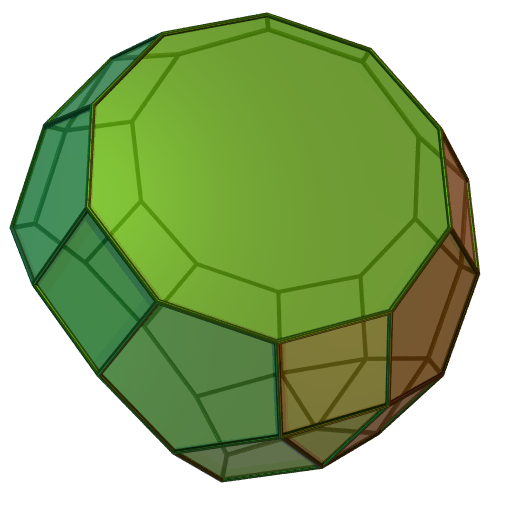
- Type: Johnson; J_{82} – J_{83} – J_{84}
- Faces: 2+3 triangles 3×3+6 squares 3×3 pentagons 3 decagons
- Edges: 75
- Vertices: 45
- Vertex configuration: 5×6(4.5.10); 3×3+6(3.4.5.4)
- Symmetry group: C_{3v}
- Dual polyhedron: -
- Properties: Convex

Net
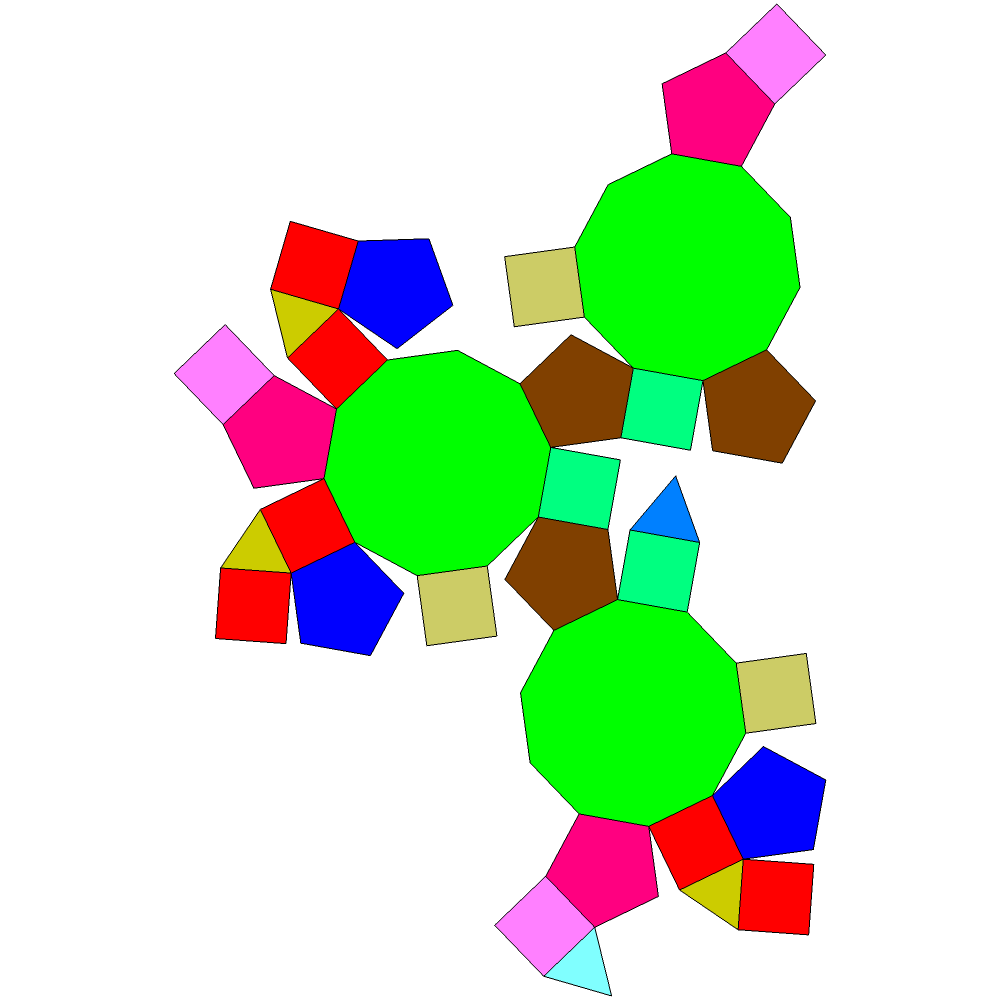

In geometry, the tridiminished rhombicosidodecahedron is one of the Johnson solids (J_{83}). It can be constructed as a rhombicosidodecahedron with three pentagonal cupolae removed.

3D model of a tridiminished rhombicosidodecahedron

A Johnson solid is one of 92 strictly convex polyhedra that are composed of regular polygon faces but are not uniform polyhedra (that is, they are not Platonic solids, Archimedean solids, prisms, or antiprisms). They were named by Norman Johnson, who first listed these polyhedra in 1966.

Related Johnson solids are:

- J_{76}: diminished rhombicosidodecahedron with one cupola removed,
- J_{80}: parabidiminished rhombicosidodecahedron with two opposing cupolae removed,
- J_{81}: metabidiminished rhombicosidodecahedron with two non-opposing cupolae removed, and
- J_{82}: gyrate bidiminished rhombicosidodecahedron with two non-opposing cupolae removed and one cupola rotated 36 degrees.
