= Diminished rhombicosidodecahedron =

76th Johnson solid (52 faces)

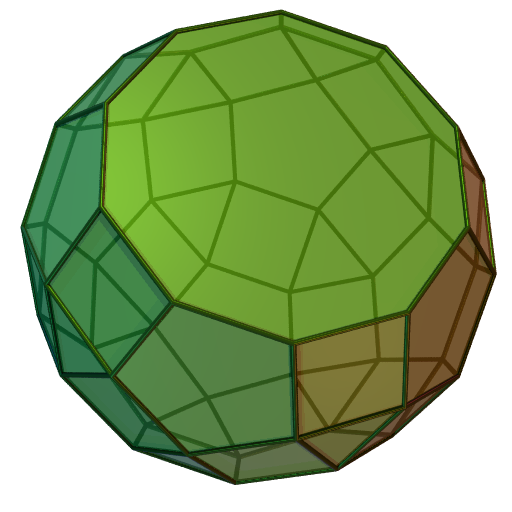
- Type: Johnson; J_{75} – J_{76} – J_{77}
- Faces: 3×5 triangles 3×5+10 squares 1+2×5 pentagons 1 decagon
- Edges: 105
- Vertices: 55
- Vertex configuration: 10(4.5.10); 3×5+3×10(3.4.5.4)
- Symmetry group: C_{5v}
- Dual polyhedron: -
- Properties: convex

Net
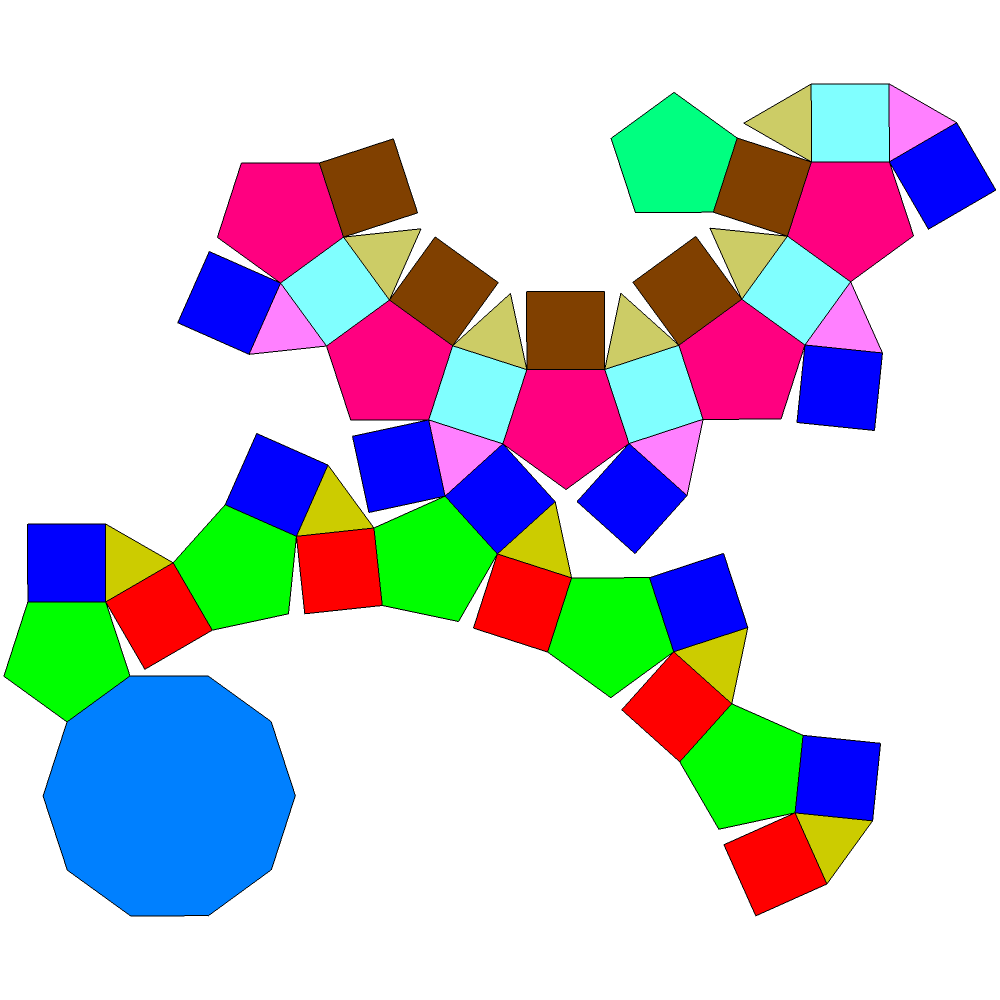

In geometry, the diminished rhombicosidodecahedron is one of the Johnson solids (J_{76}). It can be constructed as a rhombicosidodecahedron with one pentagonal cupola removed.

3D model of a diminished rhombicosidodecahedron

A Johnson solid is one of 92 strictly convex polyhedra that are composed of regular polygon faces but are not uniform polyhedra (that is, they are not Platonic solids, Archimedean solids, prisms, or antiprisms). They were named by Norman Johnson, who first listed these polyhedra in 1966.

Related Johnson solids are:

- J_{80}: parabidiminished rhombicosidodecahedron with two opposing cupolae removed, and
- J_{81}: metabidiminished rhombicosidodecahedron with two non-opposing cupolae removed, and
- J_{83}: tridiminished rhombicosidodecahedron with three cupola removed.
