= Parabidiminished rhombicosidodecahedron =

80th Johnson solid (42 faces)

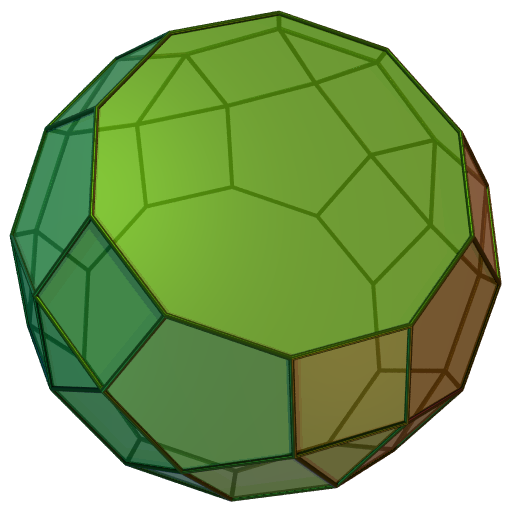
- Type: Canonical polyhedron, Johnson; J_{79} – J_{80} – J_{81}
- Faces: 10 triangles 2×10 squares 10 pentagons 2 decagons
- Edges: 90
- Vertices: 50
- Vertex configuration: 20(4.5.10); 10+20(3.4.5.4)
- Symmetry group: D_{5d}
- Dual polyhedron: -
- Properties: convex

Net
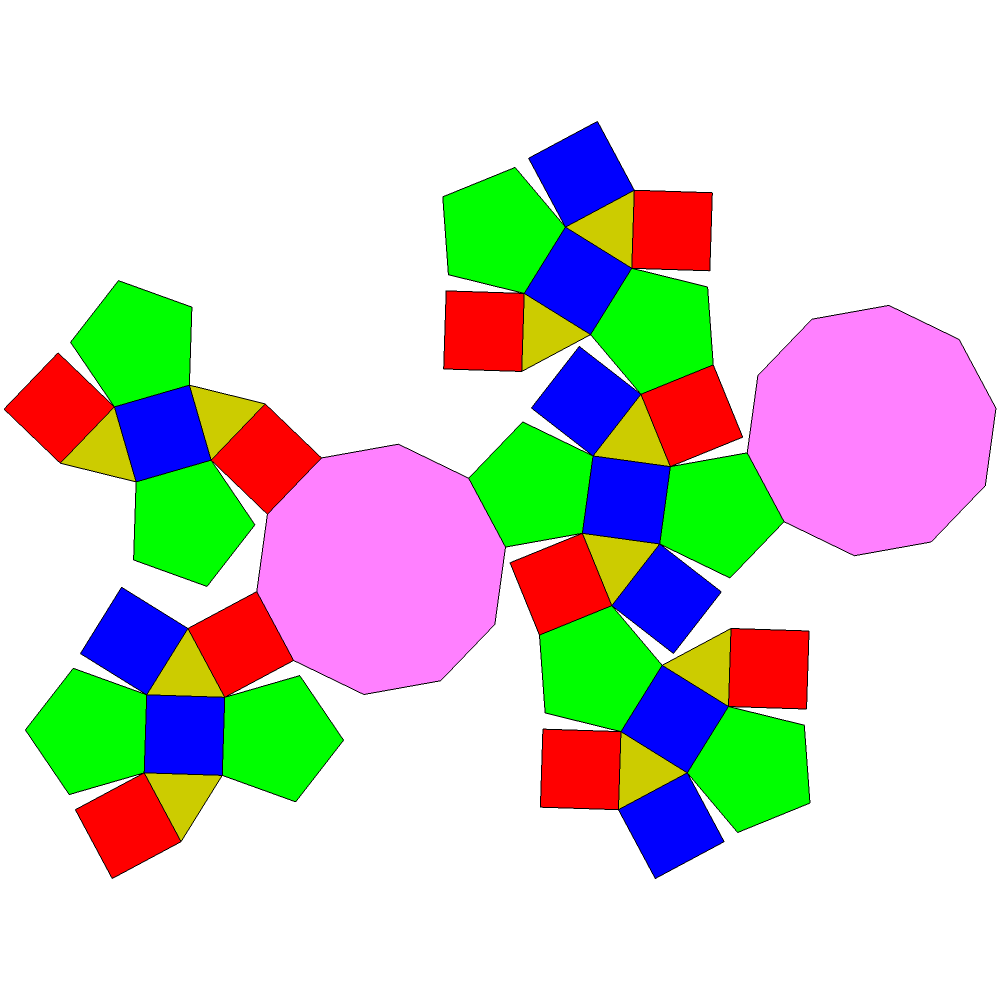

In geometry, the parabidiminished rhombicosidodecahedron is one of the Johnson solids (J_{80}). It is also a canonical polyhedron.

3D model of a parabidiminished rhombicosidodecahedron

A Johnson solid is one of 92 strictly convex polyhedra that are composed of regular polygon faces but are not uniform polyhedra (that is, they are not Platonic solids, Archimedean solids, prisms, or antiprisms). They were named by Norman Johnson, who first listed these polyhedra in 1966.

It can be constructed as a rhombicosidodecahedron with two opposing pentagonal cupolae removed. Related Johnson solids are the diminished rhombicosidodecahedron (J_{76}) where one cupola is removed, the metabidiminished rhombicosidodecahedron (J_{81}) where two non-opposing cupolae are removed, and the tridiminished rhombicosidodecahedron (J_{83}) where three cupolae are removed.

== Example ==
Parabidiminished rhombicosidodecahedron (Institute of Mathematics and Statistics, University of São Paulo)
