= Pentagonal orthobicupola =

30th Johnson solid (22 faces)

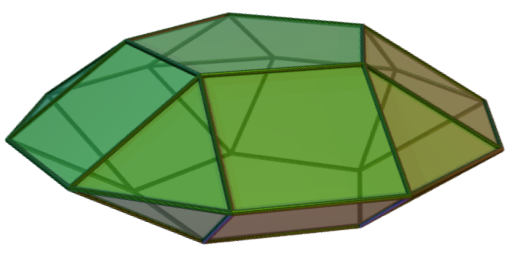
- Type: Bicupola, Johnson; J_{29} – J_{30} – J_{31}
- Faces: 10 triangles 10 squares 2 pentagons
- Edges: 40
- Vertices: 20
- Vertex configuration: 10(3^{2}.4^{2}); 10(3.4.5.4)
- Symmetry group: D_{5h}
- Dual polyhedron: -
- Properties: convex

Net
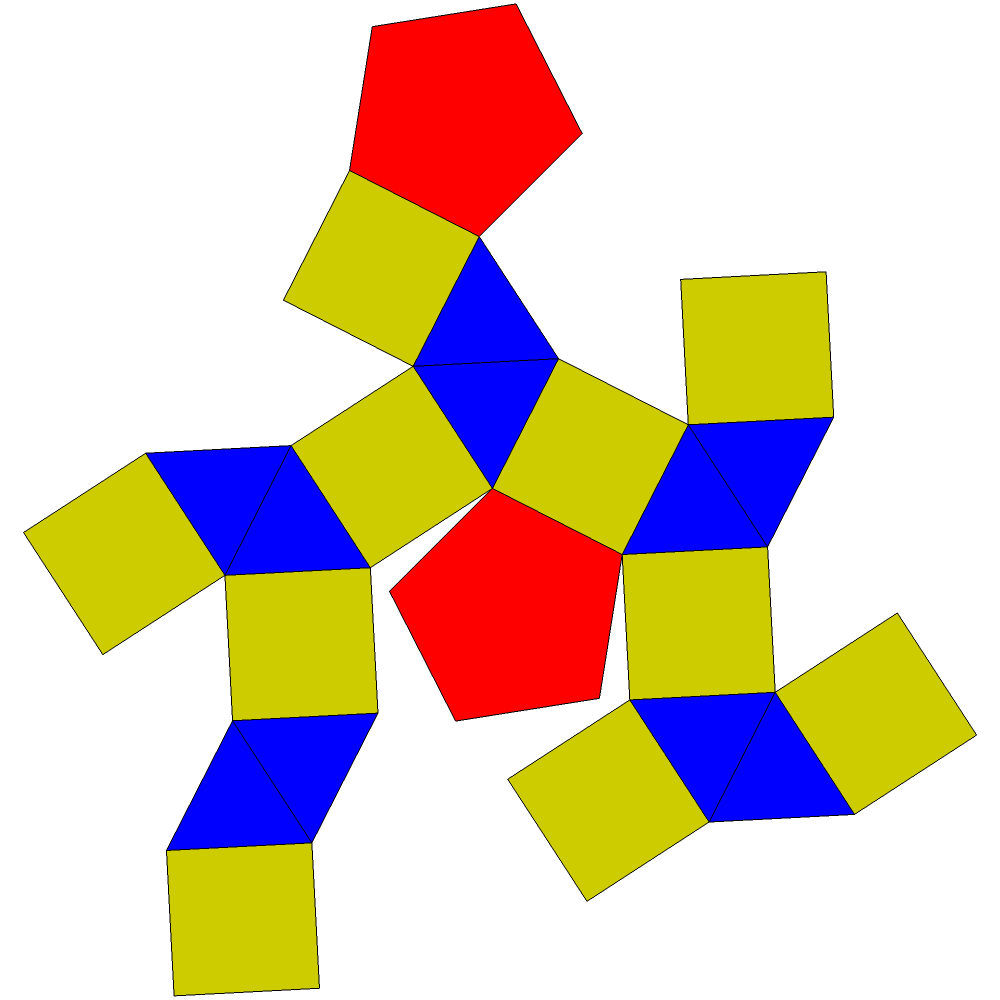

In geometry, the pentagonal orthobicupola is one of the Johnson solids (J_{30}). As the name suggests, it can be constructed by joining two pentagonal cupolae (J_{5}) along their decagonal bases, matching like faces. A 36-degree rotation of one cupola before the joining yields a pentagonal gyrobicupola (J_{31}).

The pentagonal orthobicupola is the third in an infinite set of orthobicupolae.

A Johnson solid is one of 92 strictly convex polyhedra that is composed of regular polygon faces but are not uniform polyhedra (that is, they are not Platonic solids, Archimedean solids, prisms, or antiprisms). They were named by Norman Johnson, who first listed these polyhedra in 1966.

3D model of a pentagonal orthobicupola

== Formulae ==
The following formulae for volume and surface area can be used if all faces are regular, with edge length a:

$$V=\frac{1}{3}\left(5+4\sqrt{5}\right)a^3\approx4.64809...a^3$$

$$A=\left(10+\sqrt{\frac{5}{2}\left(10+\sqrt{5}+\sqrt{75+30\sqrt{5}}\right)}\right)a^2\approx17.7711...a^2$$
