= Elongated pentagonal orthobirotunda =

42nd Johnson solid (42 faces)

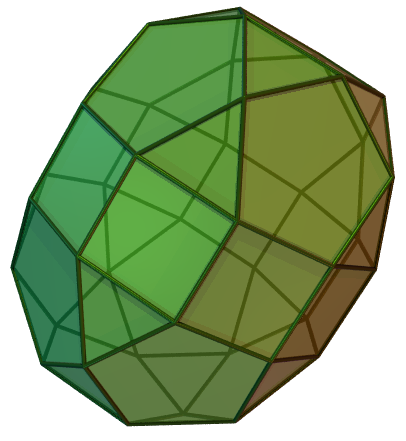
- Type: Johnson; J_{41} – J_{42} – J_{43}
- Faces: 2×10 triangles 2×5 squares 2+10 pentagons
- Edges: 80
- Vertices: 40
- Vertex configuration: 20(3.4^{2}.5); 2.10(3.5.3.5)
- Symmetry group: D_{5h}
- Dual polyhedron: -
- Properties: convex

Net
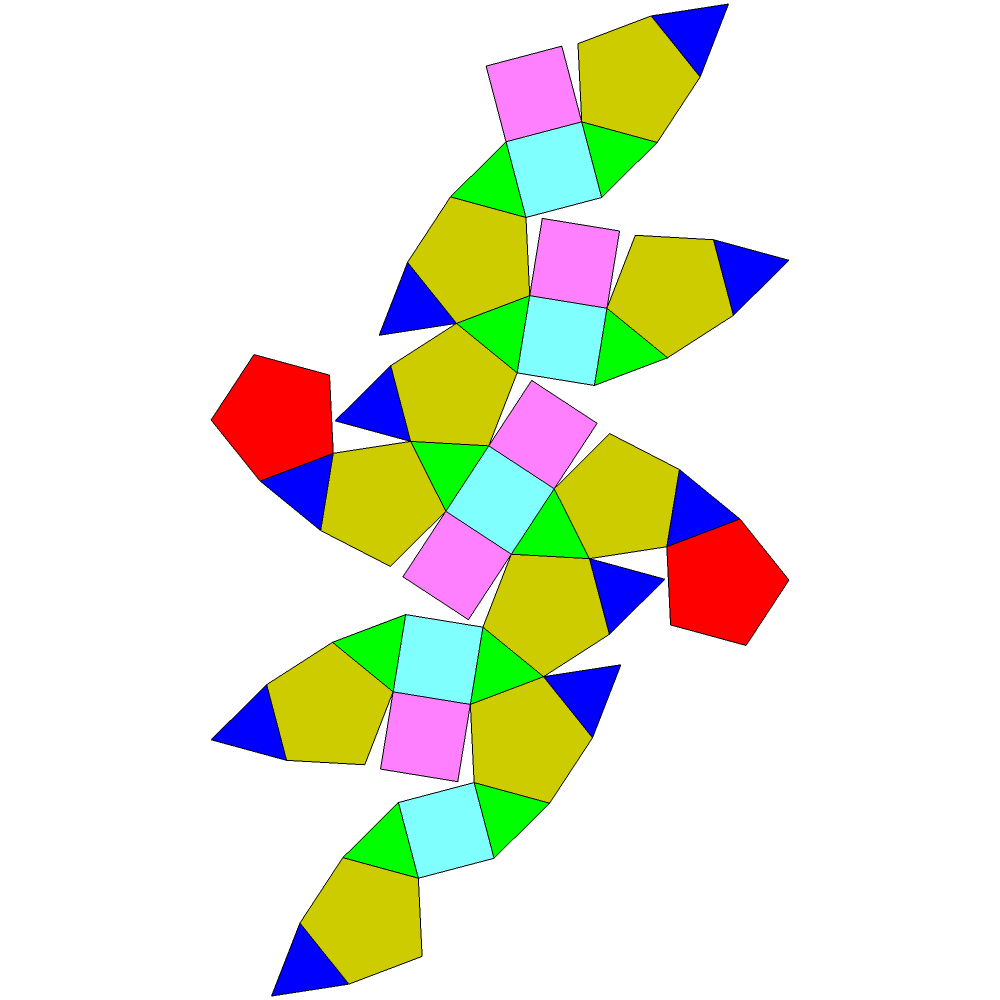

In geometry, the elongated pentagonal orthobirotunda is one of the Johnson solids (J_{42}). Its Conway polyhedron notation is at5jP5. As the name suggests, it can be constructed by elongating a pentagonal orthobirotunda (J_{34}) by inserting a decagonal prism between its congruent halves. Rotating one of the pentagonal rotundae (J_{6}) through 36 degrees before inserting the prism yields the elongated pentagonal gyrobirotunda (J_{43}).

A Johnson solid is one of 92 strictly convex polyhedra that is composed of regular polygon faces but are not uniform polyhedra (that is, they are not Platonic solids, Archimedean solids, prisms, or antiprisms). They were named by Norman Johnson, who first listed these polyhedra in 1966.

3D model of an elongated pentagonal orthobirotunda

== Formulae ==
The following formulae for volume and surface area can be used if all faces are regular, with edge length a:

$$V=\frac{1}{6}\left(45+17\sqrt{5}+15\sqrt{5+2\sqrt{5}}\right)a^3\approx21.5297...a^3$$

$$A=\left(10+\sqrt{30\left(10+3\sqrt{5}+\sqrt{75+30\sqrt{5}}\right)}\right)a^2\approx39.306...a^2$$
