= Gyroelongated pentagonal birotunda =

48th Johnson solid (52 faces)

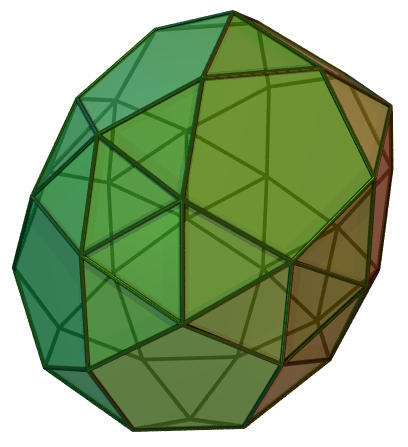
- Type: Johnson; J_{47} – J_{48} – J_{49}
- Faces: 4×10 triangles 2+10 pentagons
- Edges: 90
- Vertices: 40
- Vertex configuration: 2×10(3.5.3.5); 2.10(3^{4}.5)
- Symmetry group: D_{5}
- Dual polyhedron: -
- Properties: convex, chiral

Net
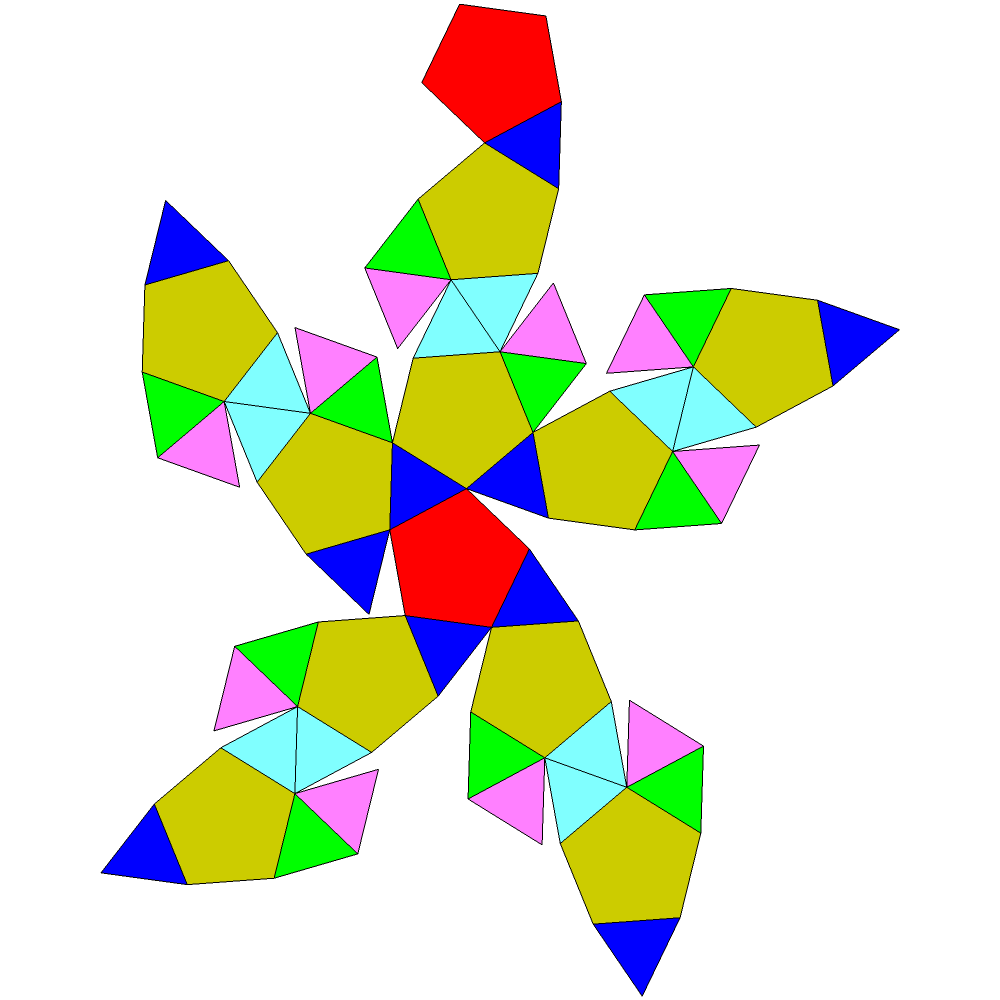

In geometry, the gyroelongated pentagonal birotunda is one of the Johnson solids (J_{48}). As the name suggests, it can be constructed by gyroelongating a pentagonal birotunda (either J_{34} or the icosidodecahedron) by inserting a decagonal antiprism between its two halves.

A Johnson solid is one of 92 strictly convex polyhedra that are composed of regular polygon faces but are not uniform polyhedra (that is, they are not Platonic solids, Archimedean solids, prisms, or antiprisms). They were named by Norman Johnson, who first listed these polyhedra in 1966.

The gyroelongated pentagonal birotunda is one of five Johnson solids which are chiral, meaning that they have a "left-handed" and a "right-handed" form. In the illustration to the right, each pentagonal face on the bottom half of the figure is connected by a path of two triangular faces to a pentagonal face above it and to the left. In the figure of opposite chirality (the mirror image of the illustrated figure), each bottom pentagon would be connected to a pentagonal face above it and to the right. The two chiral forms of J_{48} are not considered different Johnson solids.

3D model of a gyroelongated pentagonal birotunda

== Area and volume ==
With edge length a, the surface area is

$$A=\left(10\sqrt{3} + 3\sqrt{25+10\sqrt{5}}\right) a^2\approx37.966236883...a^2,$$

and the volume is

$V=\left(\frac{45}{6}+\frac{17}{6}\sqrt{5} + \frac{5}{6}\sqrt{2\sqrt{650+290\sqrt{5}}-2\sqrt{5}-2}\right) a^3$ $\approx20.584813812...a^3.$

== See also ==
- Birotunda
