= Pentagonal gyrobicupola =

31st Johnson solid (22 faces)

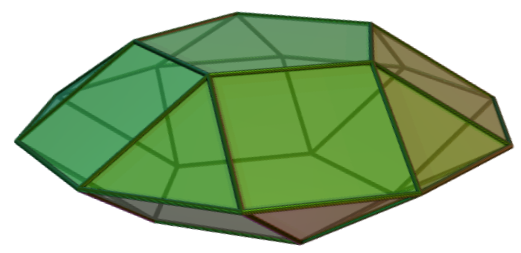
- Type: Bicupola, Johnson; J_{30} – J_{31} – J_{32}
- Faces: 10 triangles 10 squares 2 pentagons
- Edges: 40
- Vertices: 20
- Vertex configuration: $10 \times (3 \times 4 \times 3 \times 4)$ $10 \times (3 \times 4 \times 5 \times 4)$
- Symmetry group: $D_{5 \mathrm{d}}$
- Properties: convex, composite

Net

The pentagonal gyrobicupola is a polyhedron that is constructed by attaching two pentagonal cupolas base-to-base, each of its cupolas is twisted at 36°. It is an example of a Johnson solid and a composite polyhedron.

== Construction ==
The pentagonal gyrobicupola is a composite polyhedron: it is constructed by attaching two pentagonal cupolas base-to-base. This construction is similar to the pentagonal orthobicupola; the difference is that one of the cupolas in the pentagonal gyrobicupola is twisted at 36°, as suggested by the prefix gyro-. The resulting polyhedron has the same faces as the pentagonal orthobicupola does: those cupolas cover their decagonal bases, replacing them with ten equilateral triangles, ten squares, and two regular pentagons. A convex polyhedron in which all of its faces are regular polygons is the Johnson solid. The pentagonal gyrobicupola has these, enumerating it as the thirty-first Johnson solid $J_{31}$.

== Properties ==
3D model of a pentagonal gyrobicupola

The surface area of a pentagonal gyrobicupola $A$ is the sum of its faces' area, and its volume $V$ is twice the volume of a pentagonal cupola:
$$\begin{align}
A &= \frac{20 + \sqrt{100 + 10 \sqrt{5} + 10\sqrt{75+30\sqrt{5}}}}{2}a^2 \approx 17.771a^2, \\
V &= \frac{5+4\sqrt{5}}{3}a^3 \approx 4.648a^3.
\end{align}$$

The pentagonal gyrobicupola has a three-dimensional symmetry group, the antiprismatic symmetry of $D_{5d}$. Its dihedral angles (i.e., the angle between two adjacent polygonal faces) are as follows:

- the angle between a pentagon and a square is 159.09°.
- the angle between a square and a triangle, within one cupola, is 148.28°;
- the dihedral angle at the plane joining the two cupolas is the sum of the dihedral angle between square-to-decagon and triangle-to-decagon, 69.09°.
