= Elongated triangular orthobicupola =

35th Johnson solid (20 faces)

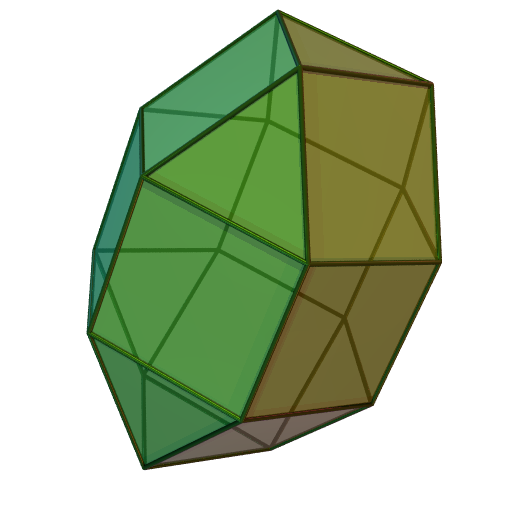
- Type: Johnson; J_{34} – J_{35} – J_{36}
- Faces: 8 triangles 12 squares
- Edges: 36
- Vertices: 18
- Vertex configuration: $$\begin{align} &6 \times (3 \times 4 \times 3 \times 4) + \\ &12 \times (3 \times 4^3) \end{align}$$
- Symmetry group: $D_{3h}$
- Properties: convex

Net
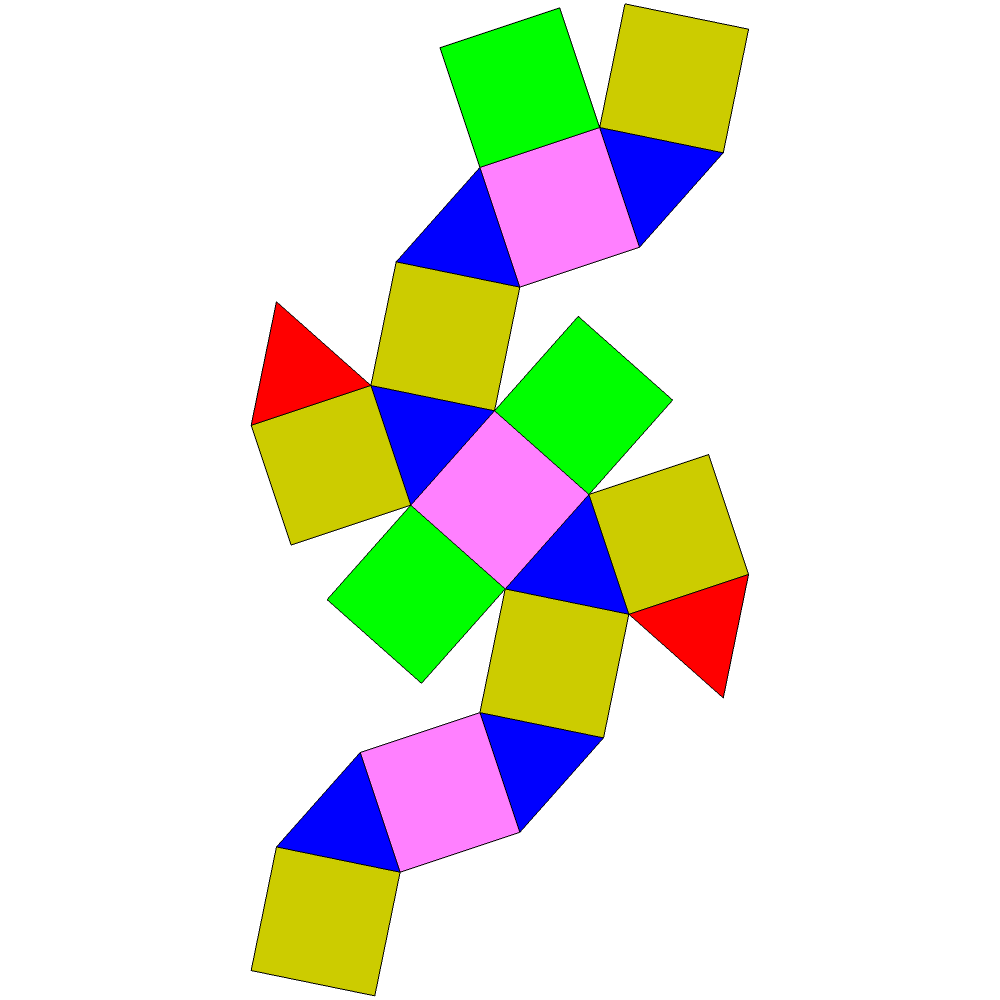

In geometry, the elongated triangular orthobicupola is a polyhedron constructed by attaching two regular triangular cupola into the base of a regular hexagonal prism. It is an example of Johnson solid.

3D model of an elongated triangular orthobicupola

== Construction ==
The elongated triangular orthobicupola can be constructed from a hexagonal prism by attaching two regular triangular cupolae onto its base, covering its hexagonal faces. This construction process known as elongation, giving the resulting polyhedron has 8 equilateral triangles and 12 squares. A convex polyhedron in which all faces are regular is Johnson solid, and the elongated triangular orthobicupola is one among them, enumerated as 35th Johnson solid $J_{35}$.

== Properties ==
An elongated triangular orthobicupola with a given edge length $a$ has a surface area, by adding the area of all regular faces:
$$\left(12 + 2\sqrt{3}\right)a^2 \approx 15.464a^2.$$
Its volume can be calculated by cutting it off into two triangular cupolae and a hexagonal prism with regular faces, and then adding their volumes up:
$$\left(\frac{5\sqrt{2}}{3} + \frac{3\sqrt{3}}{2}\right)a^3 \approx 4.955a^3.$$

It has the same three-dimensional symmetry groups as the triangular orthobicupola, the dihedral group $D_{3h}$ of order 12. Its dihedral angle can be calculated by adding the angle of the triangular cupola and hexagonal prism. The dihedral angle of a hexagonal prism between two adjacent squares is the internal angle of a regular hexagon $120^\circ = 2\pi/3$, and that between its base and square face is $\pi/2 = 90^\circ$. The dihedral angle of a regular triangular cupola between each triangle and the hexagon is approximately $70.5^\circ$, that between each square and the hexagon is $54.7^\circ$, and that between square and triangle is $125.3^\circ$. The dihedral angle of an elongated triangular orthobicupola between the triangle-to-square and square-to-square, on the edge where the triangular cupola and the prism is attached, is respectively:
$$\begin{align}
\frac{\pi}{2} + 70.5^\circ &\approx 160.5^\circ, \\
\frac{\pi}{2} + 54.7^\circ &\approx 144.7^\circ.
\end{align}$$

== Related polyhedra and honeycombs ==
The elongated triangular orthobicupola forms space-filling honeycombs with tetrahedra and square pyramids.
