= Elongated pentagonal gyrobirotunda =

43rd Johnson solid (42 faces)

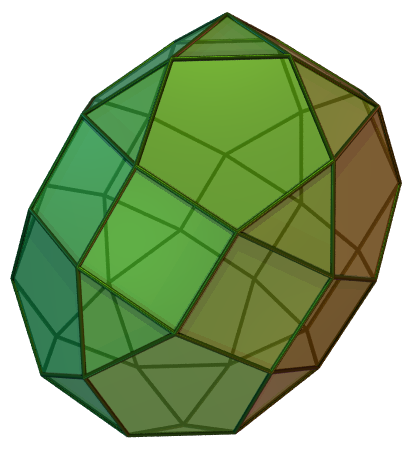
- Type: Johnson; J_{42} – J_{43} – J_{44}
- Faces: 10+10 triangles 10 squares 2+10 pentagons
- Edges: 80
- Vertices: 40
- Vertex configuration: 20(3.4^{2}.5); 2.10(3.5.3.5)
- Symmetry group: D_{5d}
- Dual polyhedron: -
- Properties: convex

Net
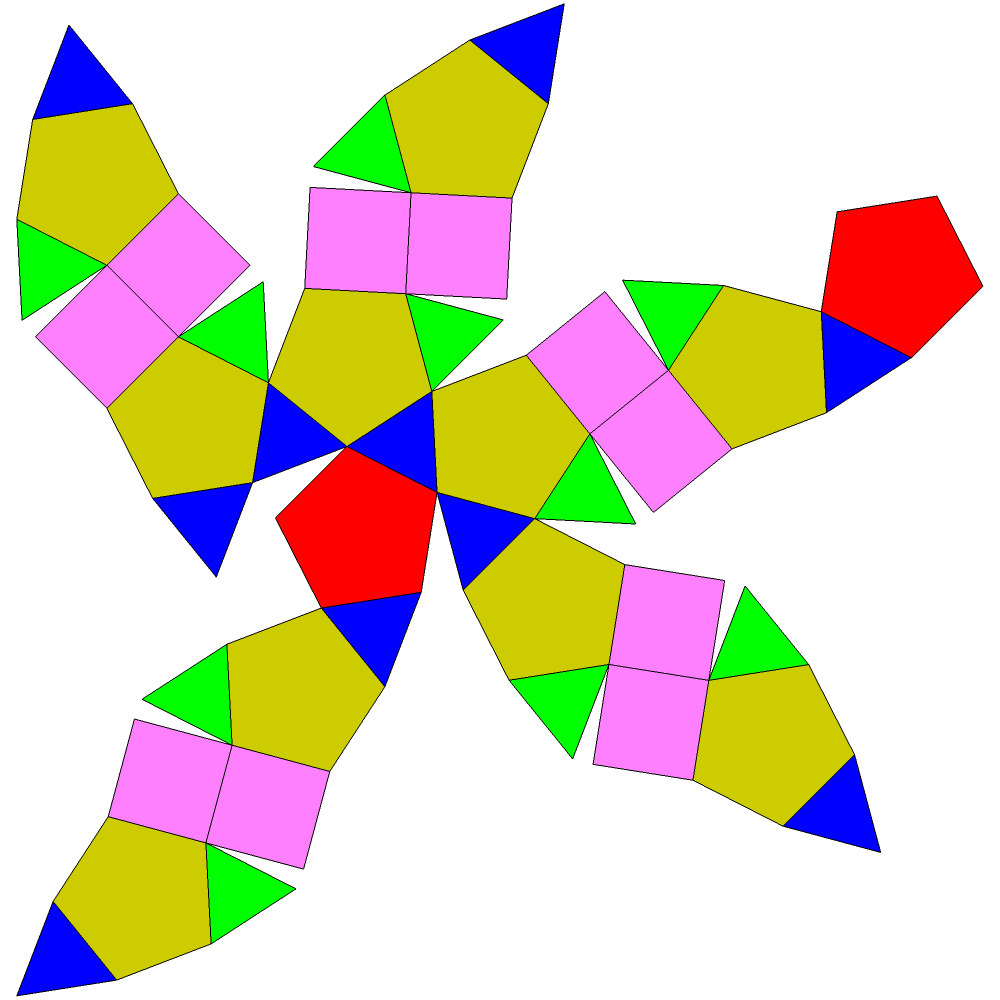

In geometry, the elongated pentagonal gyrobirotunda or elongated icosidodecahedron is one of the Johnson solids (J_{43}). As the name suggests, it can be constructed by elongating a "pentagonal gyrobirotunda," or icosidodecahedron (one of the Archimedean solids), by inserting a decagonal prism between its congruent halves. Rotating one of the pentagonal rotundae (J_{6}) through 36 degrees before inserting the prism yields an elongated pentagonal orthobirotunda (J_{42}).

A Johnson solid is one of 92 strictly convex polyhedra that is composed of regular polygon faces but are not uniform polyhedra (that is, they are not Platonic solids, Archimedean solids, prisms, or antiprisms). They were named by Norman Johnson, who first listed these polyhedra in 1966.

3D model of an elongated pentagonal gyrobirotunda

== Formulae ==
The following formulae for volume and surface area can be used if all faces are regular, with edge length a:

$$V=\frac{1}{6}\left(45+17\sqrt{5}+15\sqrt{5+2\sqrt{5}}\right)a^3 \approx 21.5297 a^3$$
$$A=\left(10+\sqrt{30\left(10+3\sqrt{5}+\sqrt{75+30\sqrt{5}}\right)}\right)a^2 \approx 39.306 a^2$$
