= Elongated triangular gyrobicupola =

36th Johnson solid (20 faces)

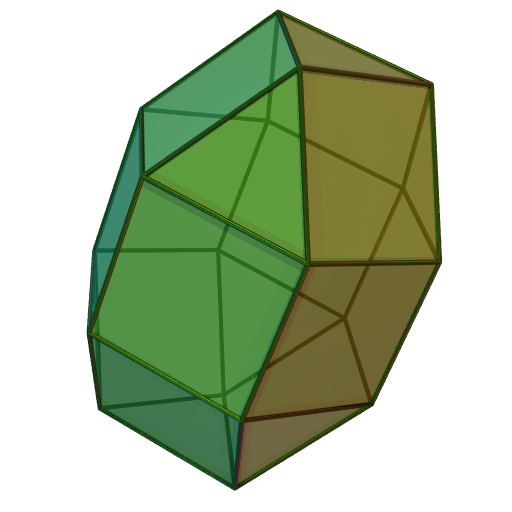
- Type: Johnson; J_{35} – J_{36} – J_{37}
- Faces: 8 triangles 12 squares
- Edges: 36
- Vertices: 18
- Vertex configuration: $$\begin{align} &6 \times (3 \times 4 \times 3 \times 4) + \\ &12 \times (3 \times 4^3) \end{align}$$
- Symmetry group: $D_{3h}$
- Properties: convex

Net
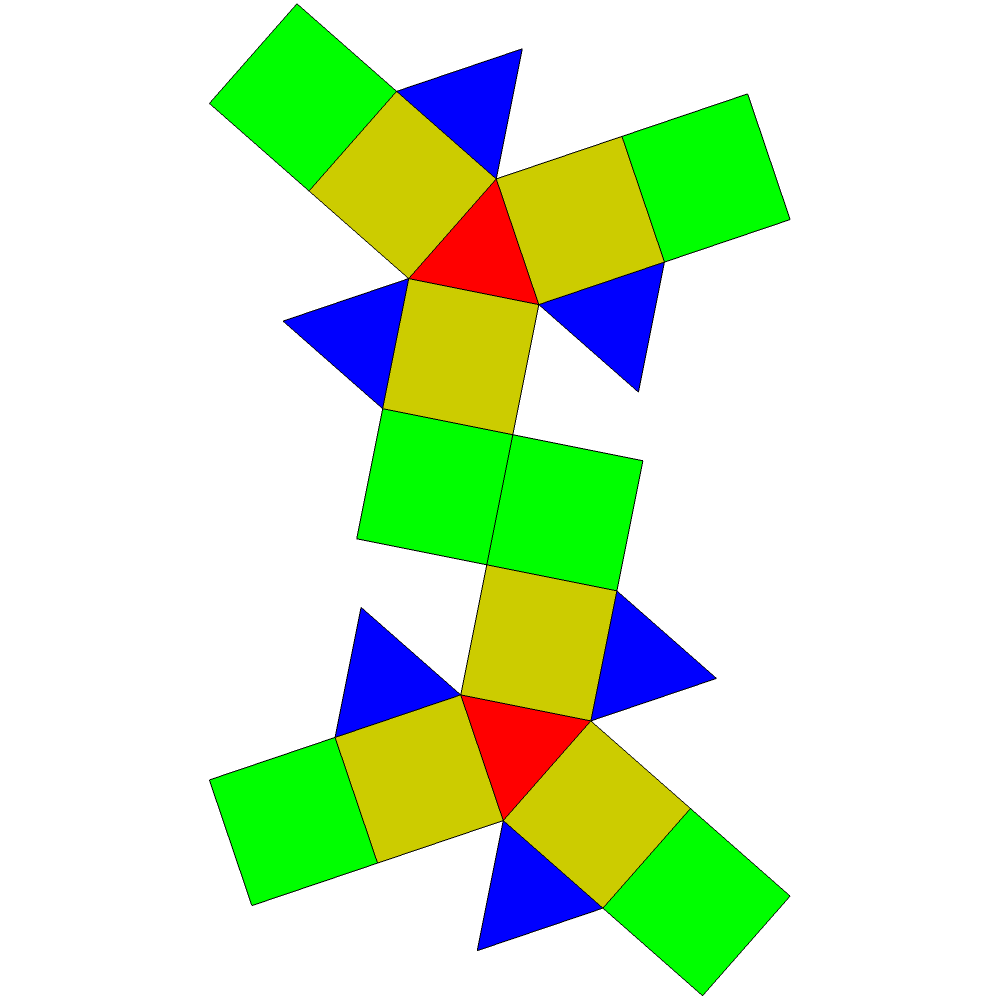

In geometry, the elongated triangular gyrobicupola is a polyhedron constructed by attaching two regular triangular cupolas to the base of a regular hexagonal prism, with one of them rotated in $60^\circ$. It is an example of Johnson solid.

3D model of an elongated triangular gyrobicupola

== Construction ==
The elongated triangular gyrobicupola is similarly can be constructed as the elongated triangular orthobicupola, started from a hexagonal prism by attaching two regular triangular cupolae onto its base, covering its hexagonal faces. This construction process is known as elongation, giving the resulting polyhedron has 8 equilateral triangles and 12 squares. The difference between those two polyhedrons is one of two triangular cupolas in the elongated triangular gyrobicupola is rotated in $60^\circ$. A convex polyhedron in which all faces are regular is Johnson solid, and the elongated triangular gyrobicupola is one among them, enumerated as 36th Johnson solid $J_{36}$.

== Properties ==
An elongated triangular gyrobicupola with a given edge length $a$ has a surface area by adding the area of all regular faces:
$$\left(12 + 2\sqrt{3}\right)a^2 \approx 15.464a^2.$$
Its volume can be calculated by cutting it off into two triangular cupolae and a hexagonal prism with regular faces, and then adding their volumes up:
$$\left(\frac{5\sqrt{2}}{3} + \frac{3\sqrt{3}}{2}\right)a^3 \approx 4.955a^3.$$

Its three-dimensional symmetry groups is the prismatic symmetry, the dihedral group $D_{3d}$ of order 12. Its dihedral angle can be calculated by adding the angle of the triangular cupola and hexagonal prism. The dihedral angle of a hexagonal prism between two adjacent squares is the internal angle of a regular hexagon $120^\circ = 2\pi/3$, and that between its base and square face is $\pi/2 = 90^\circ$. The dihedral angle of a regular triangular cupola between each triangle and the hexagon is approximately $70.5^\circ$, that between each square and the hexagon is $54.7^\circ$, and that between square and triangle is $125.3^\circ$. The dihedral angle of an elongated triangular orthobicupola between the triangle-to-square and square-to-square, on the edge where the triangular cupola and the prism is attached, is respectively:
$$\begin{align}
\frac{\pi}{2} + 70.5^\circ &\approx 160.5^\circ, \\
\frac{\pi}{2} + 54.7^\circ &\approx 144.7^\circ.
\end{align}$$

== Related polyhedra and honeycombs ==
The elongated triangular gyrobicupola forms space-filling honeycombs with tetrahedra and square pyramids.
