= Pentagonal gyrocupolarotunda =

33rd Johnson solid (27 faces)

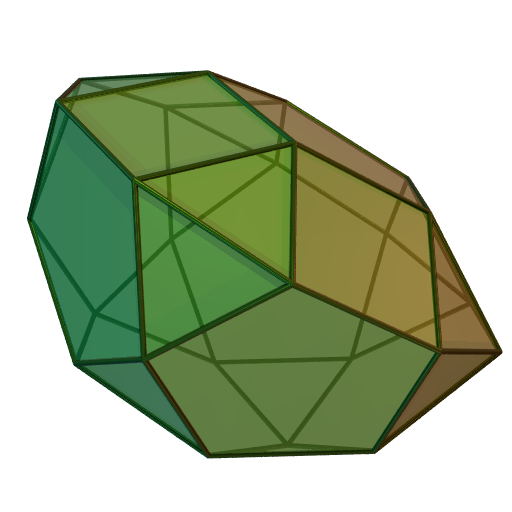
- Type: Johnson; J_{32} – J_{33} – J_{34}
- Faces: 3×5 triangles 5 squares 2+5 pentagons
- Edges: 50
- Vertices: 25
- Vertex configuration: 10(3^{2}.4.5); 5(3.4.5.4); 2.5(3.5.3.5)
- Symmetry group: C_{5v}
- Dual polyhedron: -
- Properties: convex

Net
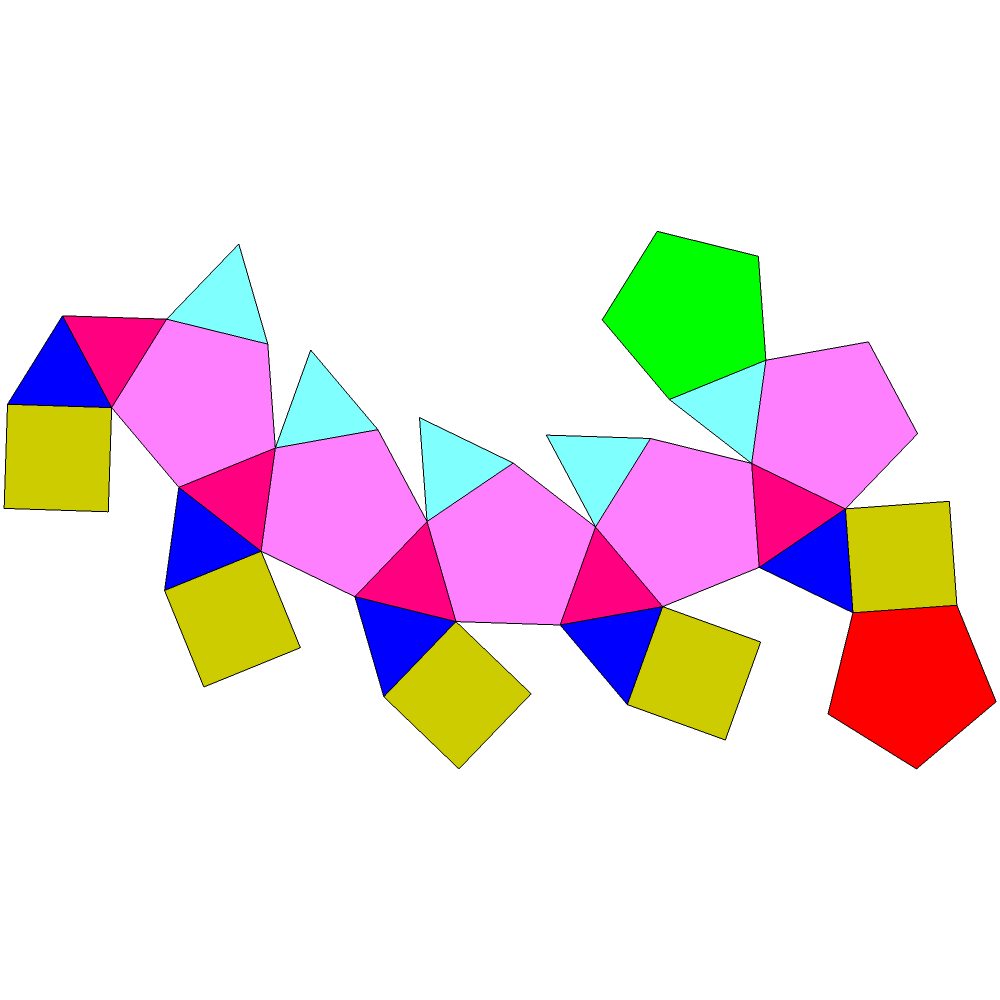

In geometry, the pentagonal gyrocupolarotunda is one of the Johnson solids (J_{33}). Like the pentagonal orthocupolarotunda (J_{32}), it can be constructed by joining a pentagonal cupola (J_{5}) and a pentagonal rotunda (J_{6}) along their decagonal bases. The difference is that in this solid, the two halves are rotated 36 degrees with respect to one another.

A Johnson solid is one of 92 strictly convex polyhedra that is composed of regular polygon faces but are not uniform polyhedra (that is, they are not Platonic solids, Archimedean solids, prisms, or antiprisms). They were named by Norman Johnson, who first listed these polyhedra in 1966.

3D model of a pentagonal gyrocupolarotunda

== Formulae ==
The following formulae for volume and surface area can be used if all faces are regular, with edge length a:

$$V=\frac{5}{12}\left(11+5\sqrt{5}\right)a^3\approx9.24181...a^3$$

$$A= \left(5+\frac{15}{4}\sqrt{3}+\frac{7}{4}\sqrt{25+10\sqrt{5}}\right) a^2\approx23.5385...a^2$$
