= Pentagonal orthocupolarotunda =

32nd Johnson solid (27 faces)

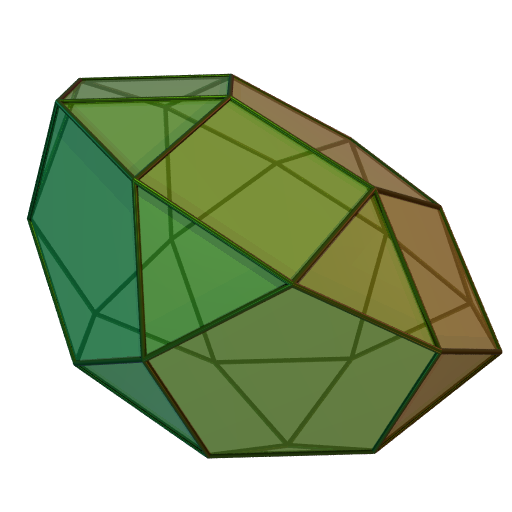
- Type: Johnson; J_{31} – J_{32} – J_{33}
- Faces: 3×5 triangles 5 squares 2+5 pentagons
- Edges: 50
- Vertices: 25
- Vertex configuration: 10(3.4.3.5); 5(3.4.5.4); 2.5(3.5.3.5)
- Symmetry group: C_{5v}
- Dual polyhedron: -
- Properties: convex

Net
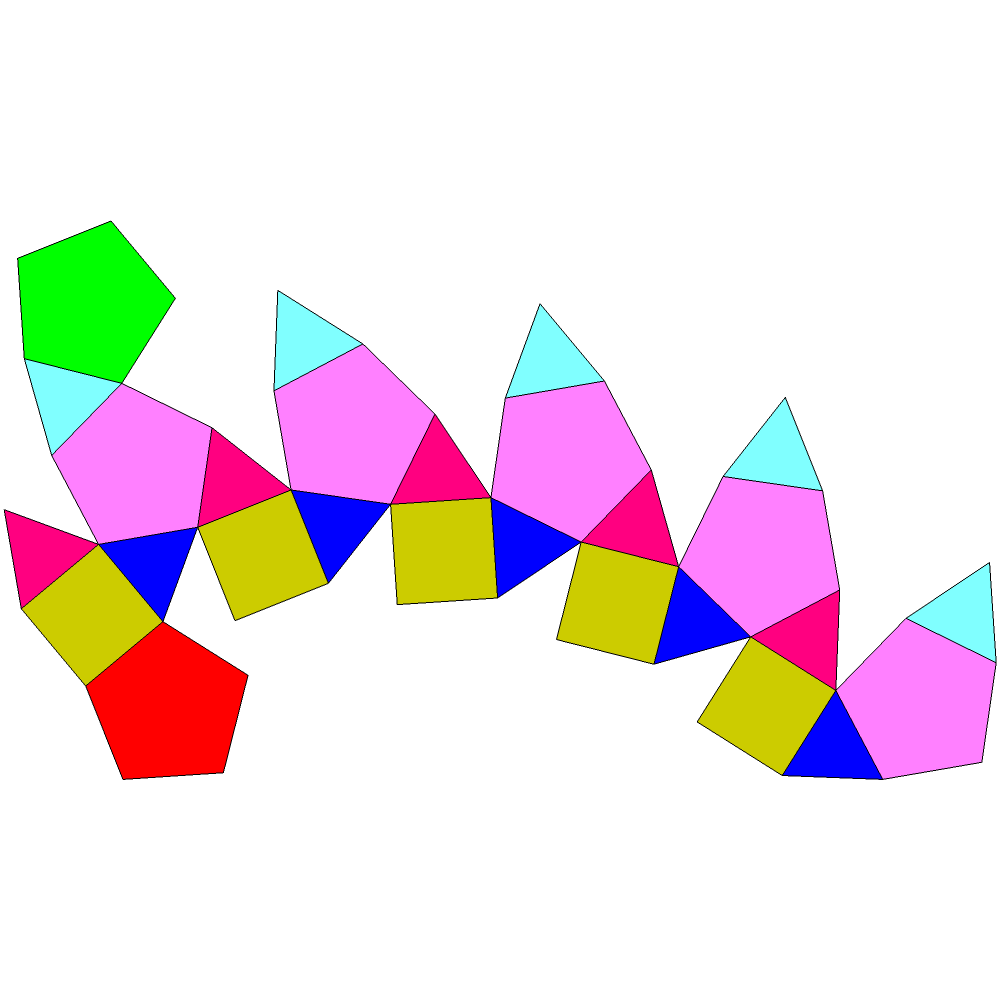

In geometry, the pentagonal orthocupolarotunda is one of the Johnson solids (J_{32}). As the name suggests, it can be constructed by joining a pentagonal cupola (J_{5}) and a pentagonal rotunda (J_{6}) along their decagonal bases, matching the pentagonal faces. A 36-degree rotation of one of the halves before the joining yields a pentagonal gyrocupolarotunda (J_{33}).

A Johnson solid is one of 92 strictly convex polyhedra that is composed of regular polygon faces but are not uniform polyhedra (that is, they are not Platonic solids, Archimedean solids, prisms, or antiprisms). They were named by Norman Johnson, who first listed these polyhedra in 1966.

3D model of a pentagonal orthocupolarotunda

== Formulae ==
The following formulae for volume and surface area can be used if all faces are regular, with edge length a:

$$V=\frac{5}{12}\left(11+5\sqrt{5}\right)a^3\approx9.24181...a^3$$

$$A=\left(5+\frac{1}{4}\sqrt{1900+490\sqrt{5}+210\sqrt{75+30\sqrt{5}}}\right)a^2\approx23.5385...a^2$$
