= Gyroelongated triangular bicupola =

44th Johnson solid (26 faces)

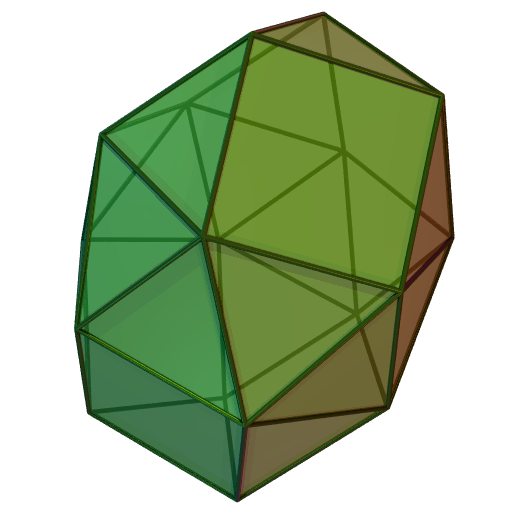
- Type: Johnson; J_{43} – J_{44} – J_{45}
- Faces: 2+3×6 triangles 6 squares
- Edges: 42
- Vertices: 18
- Vertex configuration: 6(3.4.3.4); 2.6(3^{4}.4)
- Symmetry group: D_{3}
- Dual polyhedron: -
- Properties: convex, chiral

Net
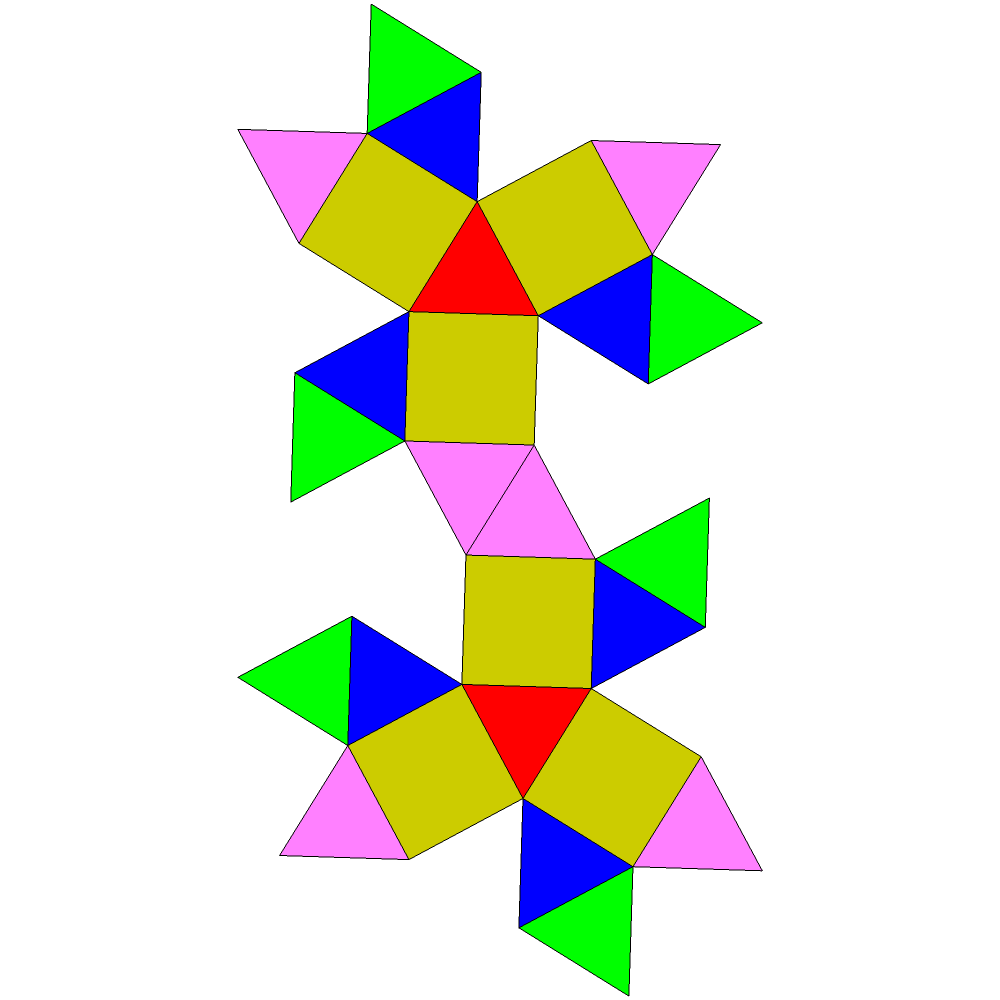

In geometry, the gyroelongated triangular bicupola is one of the Johnson solids (J_{44}). As the name suggests, it can be constructed by gyroelongating a triangular bicupola (either triangular orthobicupola, J_{27}, or the cuboctahedron) by inserting a hexagonal antiprism between its congruent halves.

A Johnson solid is one of 92 strictly convex polyhedra that are composed of regular polygon faces but are not uniform polyhedra (that is, they are not Platonic solids, Archimedean solids, prisms, or antiprisms). They were named by Norman Johnson, who first listed these polyhedra in 1966.

The gyroelongated triangular bicupola is one of five Johnson solids which are chiral, meaning that they have a "left-handed" and a "right-handed" form. In the illustration to the right, each square face on the bottom half of the figure is connected by a path of two triangular faces to a square face above it and to the right. In the figure of opposite chirality (the mirror image of the illustrated figure), each bottom square would be connected to a square face above it and to the left. The two chiral forms of J_{44} are not considered different Johnson solids.

3D model of a gyroelongated triangular bicupola

== Formulae ==
The following formulae for volume and surface area can be used if all faces are regular, with edge length a:

$$V= \sqrt{2} \left(\frac{5}{3}+\sqrt{1+\sqrt{3}}\right) a^3 \approx 4.69456...a^3$$

$$A=\left(6+5\sqrt{3}\right)a^2 \approx 14.6603...a^2$$
