= Rotunda (geometry) =

Solid made by joining an n- and 2n-gon with triangles and pentagons

Set of rotundas
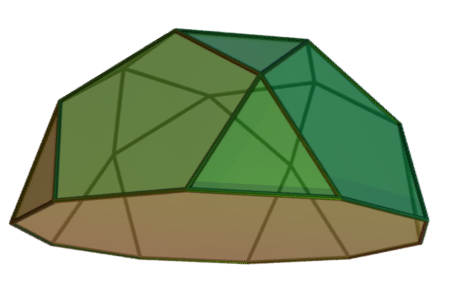
- Example: pentagonal rotunda
- Faces: 1 n-gon 1 2n-gon n pentagons 2n triangles
- Edges: 7n
- Vertices: 4n
- Symmetry group: C_{nv}, [n], (*nn), order 2n
- Rotation group: C_{n}, [n]^{+}, (nn), order n
- Properties: convex

In geometry, a rotunda is any member of a family of cyclic-symmetric polyhedra. They are similar to a cupola but, instead of alternating squares and triangles, they alternate pentagons and triangles around an axis. The pentagonal rotunda is a Johnson solid.

Other forms can be generated with dihedral symmetry and distorted equilateral pentagons.

== Examples ==
Rotundas
3	4	5	6	7	8
triangular rotunda	square rotunda	pentagonal rotunda	hexagonal rotunda	heptagonal rotunda	octagonal rotunda

== Star-rotunda ==
Star-rotundas
5	7	9	11
Pentagrammic rotunda	Heptagrammic rotunda	Enneagrammic rotunda	Hendecagrammic rotunda

== See also ==
- Birotunda
