= Elongated bipyramid =

Polyhedron formed by capping a prism with pyramids

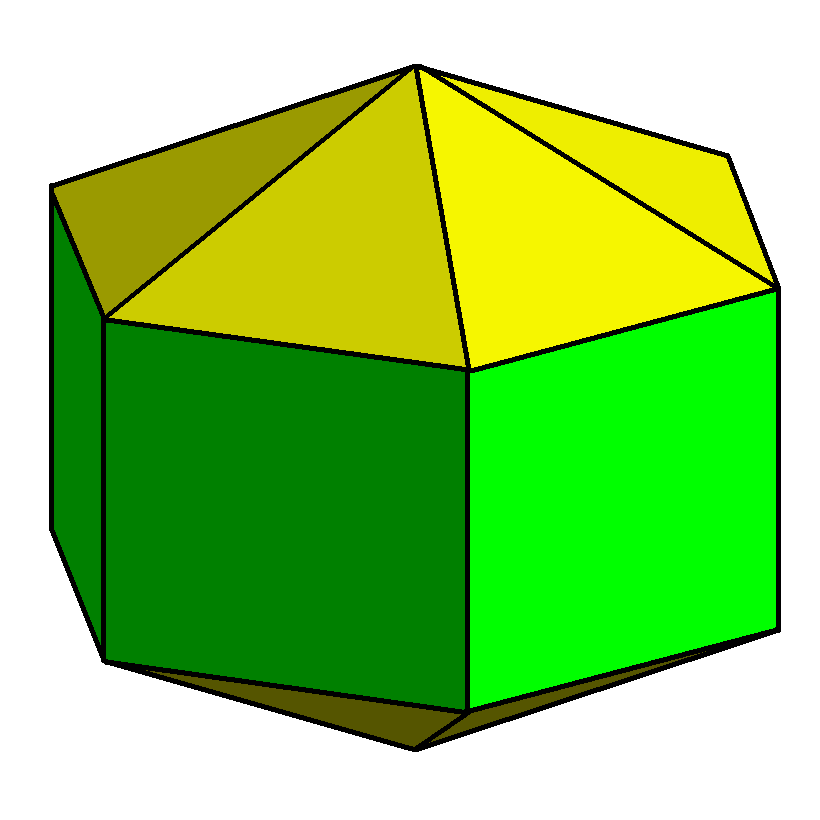
- Example: elongated hexagonal bipyramid
- Faces: 2n triangles n squares
- Edges: 5n
- Vertices: 2n + 2
- Symmetry group: D_{nh}, [n,2], (*n22)
- Rotation group: D_{n}, [n,2]^{+}, (n22)
- Dual polyhedron: bifrustums
- Properties: convex

In geometry, the elongated bipyramids are an infinite set of polyhedra, constructed by elongating an n-gonal bipyramid (by inserting an n-gonal prism between its congruent halves).

There are three elongated bipyramids that are Johnson solids:

- Elongated triangular bipyramid (J_{14}),
- Elongated square bipyramid (J_{15}), and
- Elongated pentagonal bipyramid (J_{16}).

Higher forms can be constructed with isosceles triangles.

== Forms ==
Name	elongated triangular bipyramid J_{14}	elongated square bipyramid J_{15}	elongated pentagonal bipyramid J_{16}	elongated hexagonal bipyramid
Type	Equilateral			Irregular
Image				
Faces	6 triangles, 3 squares	8 triangles, 4 squares	10 triangles, 5 squares	12 triangles, 6 squares
Dual	triangular bifrustum	square bifrustum	pentagonal bifrustum	hexagonal bifrustum

== Applications ==
Elongated bipyramids are sometimes used as dice, especially to make dice with atypical side count, such as 5 or 7. Such a die has numbers written on the square faces, which are usually heightened into rectangles for convenience in rolling. Whichever number comes face-up when the die is rolled is the side that is to be read.

== See also ==
- Gyroelongated bipyramid
- Gyroelongated pyramid
- Elongated pyramid
- Diminished trapezohedron
