= Elongated pyramid =

Polyhedron formed by capping a prism with a pyramid

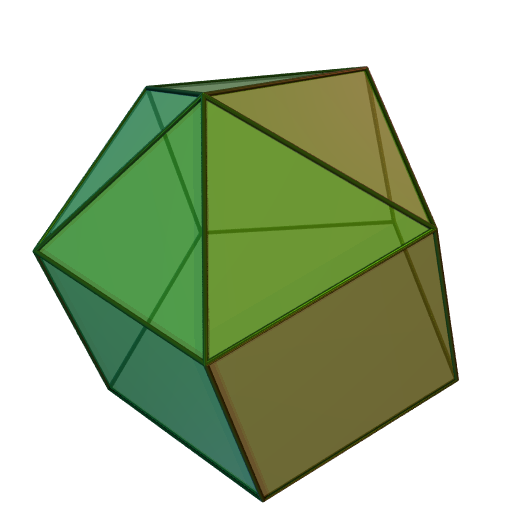
- Example: pentagonal form
- Faces: n triangles n squares 1 n-gon
- Edges: 4n
- Vertices: 2n + 1
- Symmetry group: C_{nv}, [n], (*nn)
- Rotation group: C_{n}, [n]^{+}, (nn)
- Dual polyhedron: self-dual
- Properties: convex

In geometry, the elongated pyramids are an infinite set of polyhedra, constructed by adjoining an n-gonal pyramid to an n-gonal prism. Along with the set of pyramids, these figures are topologically self-dual.

There are three elongated pyramids that are Johnson solids:

- Elongated triangular pyramid (J_{7}),
- Elongated square pyramid (J_{8}), and
- Elongated pentagonal pyramid (J_{9}).

Higher forms can be constructed with isosceles triangles.

== Forms ==
name	faces
elongated triangular pyramid (J7)	3+1 triangles, 3 squares
elongated square pyramid (J8)	4 triangles, 4+1 squares
elongated pentagonal pyramid (J9)	5 triangles, 5 squares, 1 pentagon

== See also ==
- Gyroelongated bipyramid
- Elongated bipyramid
- Gyroelongated pyramid
- Diminished trapezohedron
