= Elongated hexagonal bipyramid =

Polyhedron; hexagonal prism capped with pyramids

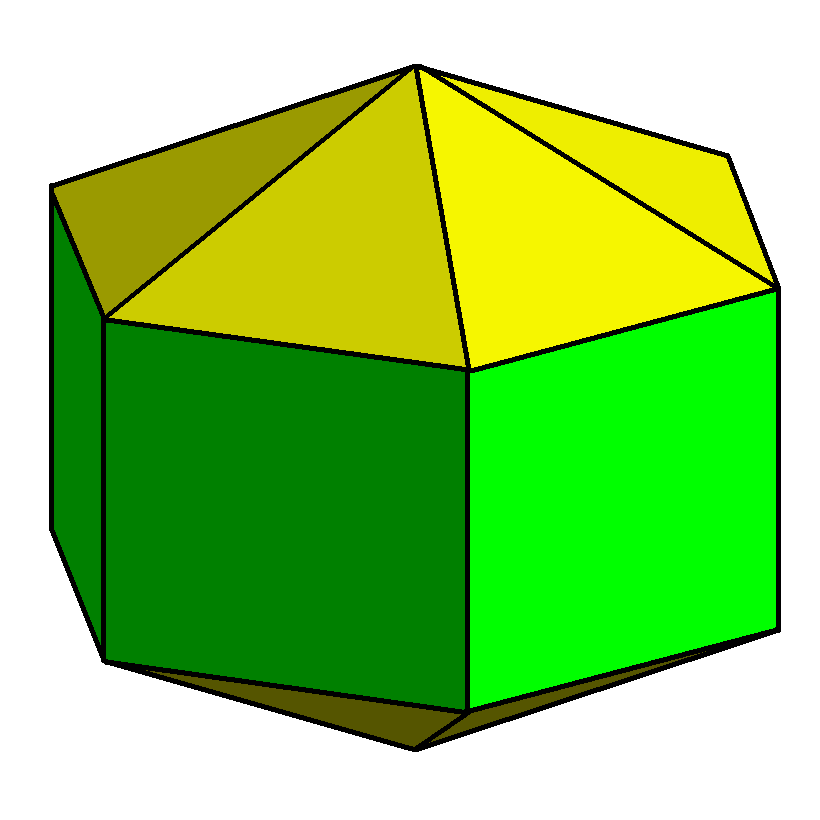
- Type: Elongated bipyramid
- Faces: 12 triangles 6 squares
- Edges: 30
- Vertices: 14
- Vertex configuration: 2 of 3^{6} 12 of 3^{2}.4^{2}
- Symmetry group: D_{6h}, [6,2], (*226)
- Dual polyhedron: Hexagonal bifrustum
- Properties: convex

Net
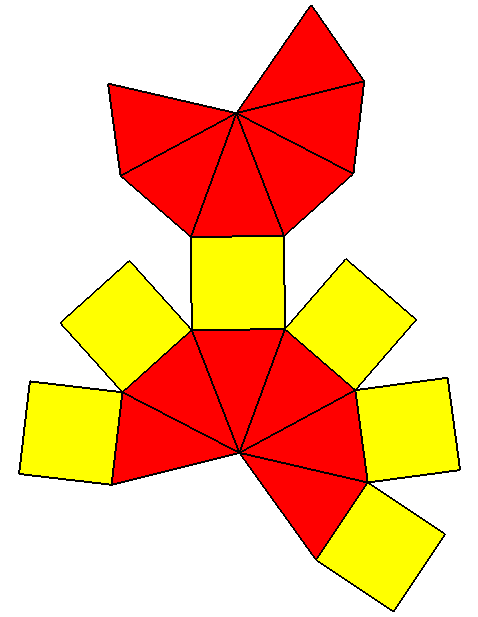

In geometry, the elongated hexagonal bipyramid is constructed by elongating a hexagonal bipyramid (by inserting a hexagonal prism between its congruent halves).

== Related polyhedra ==
This polyhedron is in the family of elongated bipyramids, of which the first three can be Johnson solids: J_{14}, J_{15}, and J_{16}. The hexagonal form can be constructed by all regular faces but is not a Johnson solid because 6 equilateral triangles would form six co-planar faces (in a regular hexagon).

== Uses ==
- A quartz crystal is an example of an elongated hexagonal bipyramid. Because it has 18 faces, it can be called an octadecahedron. Other chemicals also have this shape.
- The edge-first orthogonal projection of a 24-cell is an elongated hexagonal bipyramid.
- Used as the shape of Fruit Gushers candy.
- Used as a physical manifestation for assisting various branches of three-dimensional graph theory.
