= Octadecahedron =

Polyhedron with 18 faces

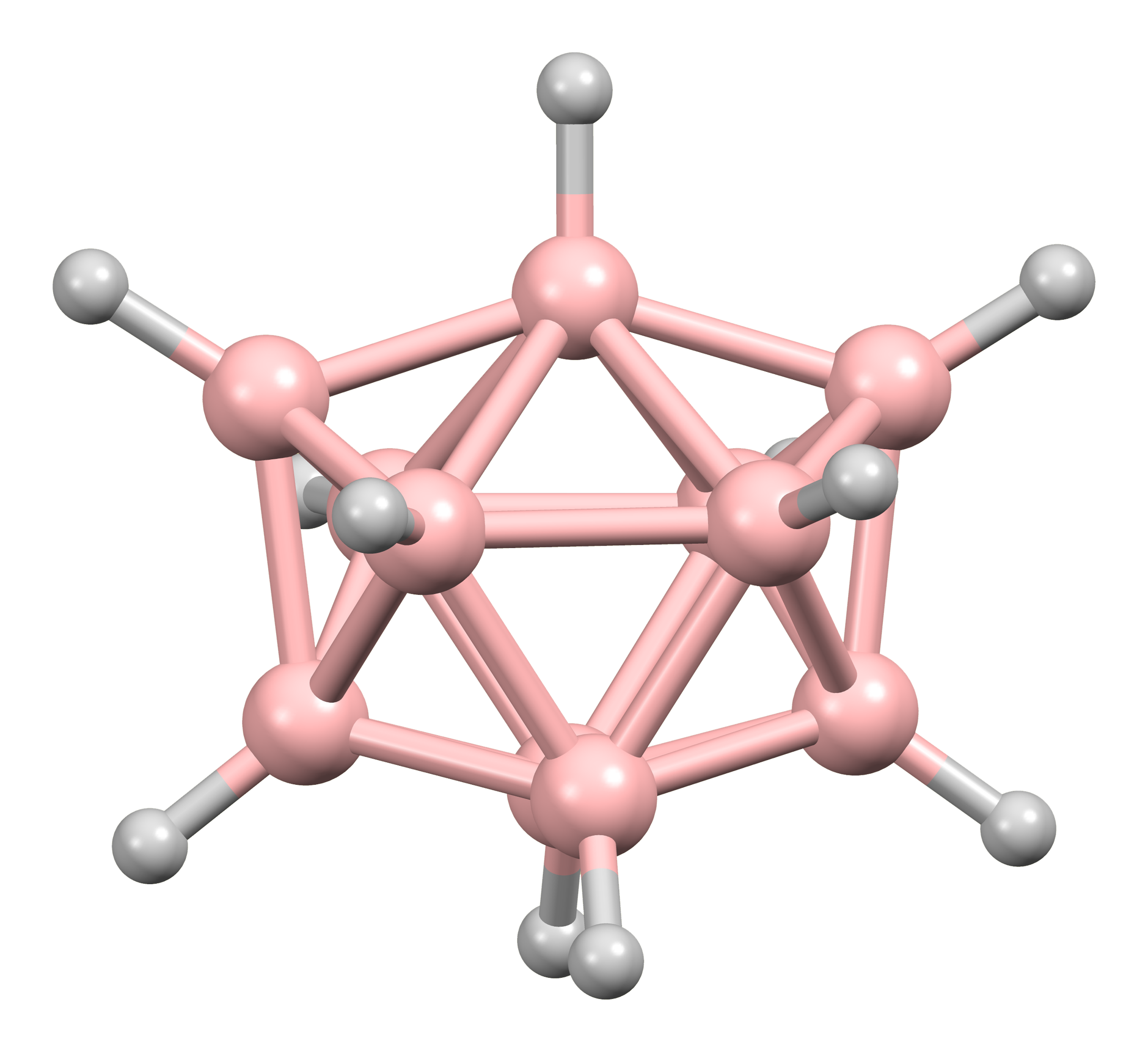
Ball-and-stick model of the octadecahedral closo-undecaborate ion, [B_{11}H_{11}]^{2−}, as found in the crystal structure of the benzyltriethylammonium salt.

In geometry, an octadecahedron (or octakaidecahedron) is a polyhedron with 18 faces. No octadecahedron is regular; hence, the name does not commonly refer to one specific polyhedron.

In chemistry, "the octadecahedron" commonly refers to a specific structure with C_{2v} symmetry, the edge-contracted icosahedron, formed from a regular icosahedron with one edge contracted. It is the shape of the closo-boranate ion [B_{11}H_{11}]^{2−}.

== Convex ==
There are 107,854,282,197,058 topologically distinct convex octadecahedra, excluding mirror images, having at least 11 vertices. (Two polyhedra are "topologically distinct" if they have intrinsically different arrangements of faces and vertices, such that it is impossible to distort one into the other simply by changing the lengths of edges or the angles between edges or faces.)

=== Examples ===
The most familiar octadecahedra are the heptadecagonal pyramid, hexadecagonal prism, and the octagonal antiprism. The hexadecagonal prism and the octagonal antiprism are uniform polyhedra, with regular bases and square or equilateral triangular sides. Four more octadecahedra are also found among the Johnson solids: the square gyrobicupola, the square orthobicupola, the elongated square cupola (also known as the diminished rhombicuboctahedron), and the sphenomegacorona. Four Johnson solids have octadecahedral duals: the elongated triangular orthobicupola, the elongated triangular gyrobicupola, the gyroelongated triangular bicupola, and the triangular hebesphenorotunda. Among near-miss Johnson solids, the chamfered cube is one notable non-uniform octadecahedron.

Octagonal antiprism	Square orthobicupola	Square gyrobicupola	Sphenomegacorona	Elongated hexagonal bipyramid	Chamfered cube

In addition, some uniform star polyhedra are also octadecahedra:

Octagrammic antiprism	Octagrammic crossed-antiprism	Small rhombihexahedron	Small dodecahemidodecahedron	Great rhombihexahedron	Great dodecahemidodecahedron
