= Bifrustum =

Polyhedron made by joining two identical frusta at their bases

Family of bifrusta
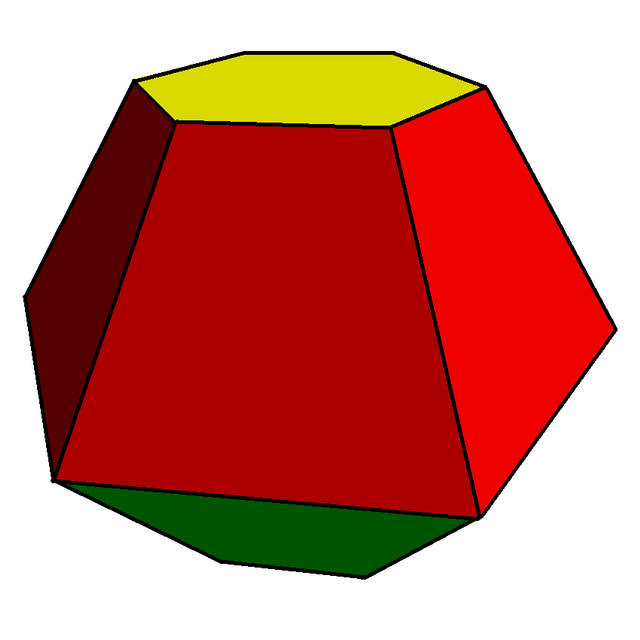
- Example: hexagonal bifrustum
- Faces: 2 n-gons 2n trapezoids
- Edges: 5n
- Vertices: 3n
- Symmetry group: D_{nh}, [n,2], (*n22)
- Surface area: $$\begin{align} &n (a+b) \sqrt{\left(\tfrac{a-b}{2} \cot{\tfrac{\pi}{n}}\right)^2+h^2} \\[2pt] & \ \ +\ n \frac{b^2}{2 \tan{\frac{\pi}{n}}} \end{align}$$
- Volume: $n \frac{a^2+b^2+ab}{6 \tan{\frac{\pi}{n}}}h$
- Dual polyhedron: Elongated bipyramids
- Properties: convex

In geometry, an n-gonal bifrustum is a polyhedron composed of three parallel planes of n-gons, with the middle plane largest and usually the top and bottom congruent.

It can be constructed as two congruent frusta combined across a plane of symmetry, and also as a bipyramid with the two polar vertices truncated.

They are duals to the family of elongated bipyramids.

== Formulae ==
For a regular n-gonal bifrustum with the equatorial polygon sides a, bases sides b and semi-height (half the distance between the planes of bases) h, the lateral surface area A_{l}, total area A and volume V are:
$$\begin{align}
A_l &= n (a+b) \sqrt{\left(\tfrac{a-b}{2} \cot{\tfrac{\pi}{n}}\right)^2+h^2} \\[4pt]
A &= A_l + n \frac{b^2}{2 \tan{\frac{\pi}{n}}} \\[4pt]
V &= n \frac{a^2+b^2+ab}{6 \tan{\frac{\pi}{n}}}h
\end{align}$$
The volume V is twice the volume of a frustum.

== Forms ==
Three bifrusta are duals to three Johnson solids, J_{14-16}. In general, an n-gonal bifrustum has 2n trapezoids, 2 n-gons, and is dual to the elongated dipyramids.

Triangular bifrustum	Square bifrustum	Pentagonal bifrustum
6 trapezoids, 2 triangles. Dual to elongated triangular bipyramid, J_{14}	8 trapezoids, 2 squares. Dual to elongated square bipyramid, J_{15}	10 trapezoids, 2 pentagons. Dual to elongated pentagonal bipyramid, J_{16}
