= Diminished trapezohedron =

Polyhedron made by truncating one end of a trapezohedron

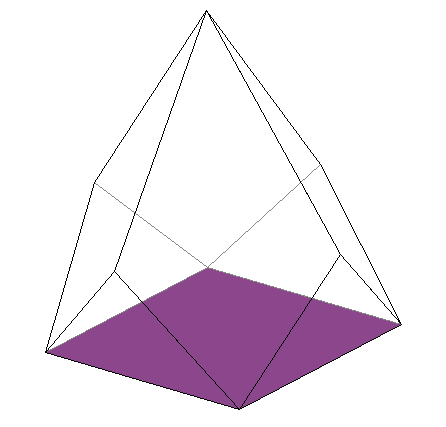
- Example square form
- Faces: n kites n triangles 1 n-gon
- Edges: 4n
- Vertices: 2n + 1
- Symmetry group: C_{nv}, [n], (*nn)
- Rotation group: C_{n}, [n]^{+}, (nn)
- Dual polyhedron: self-dual
- Properties: convex

In geometry, a diminished trapezohedron is a polyhedron in an infinite set of polyhedra, constructed by removing one of the polar vertices of a trapezohedron and replacing it by a new face (diminishment). It has one regular n-gonal base face, n triangle faces around the base, and n kites meeting on top. The kites can also be replaced by rhombi with specific proportions.

Along with the set of pyramids and elongated pyramids, these figures are topologically self-dual.

It can also be seen as an augmented n-gonal antiprism, with a n-gonal pyramid augmented onto one of the n-gonal faces, and whose height is adjusted so the upper antiprism triangle faces can be made coparallel to the pyramid faces and merged into kite-shaped faces.

They're also related to the gyroelongated pyramids, as augmented antiprisms and which are Johnson solids for n = 4, 5. This sequence has sets of two triangles instead of kite faces.

== Examples ==
Diminished trapezohedra
| Symmetry | C_{3v} | C_{4v} | C_{5v} | C_{6v} | C_{7v} | C_{8v} ... |
|---|---|---|---|---|---|---|
| Image | | | | | | |
| Rhombic form | | | | | | |
| Net | | | | | | |
| Faces | 3 trapezoids 3+1 triangles | 4 trapezoids 4 triangles 1 square | 5 trapezoids 5 triangles 1 pentagon | 6 trapezoids 6 triangles 1 hexagon | 7 trapezoids 7 triangles 1 heptagon | 8 trapezoids 7 triangles 1 octagon |
| Edges | 12 | 16 | 20 | 24 | 28 | 32 |
| Vertices | 7 | 9 | 11 | 13 | 15 | 17 |
Trapezohedra
| Symmetry | D_{3d} | D_{4d} | D_{5d} | D_{6d} | D_{7d} | D_{8d} |
| Image | 3 | 4 | 5 | 6 | | |
| Faces | 3+3 rhombi (Or squares) | 4+4 kites | 5+5 kites | 6+6 kites | 7+7 kites | |
| Edges | 12 | 16 | 20 | 24 | 28 | |
| Vertices | 8 | 10 | 12 | 14 | 16 | |
Gyroelongated pyramid or (augmented antiprisms)
| Symmetry | C_{3v} | C_{4v} | C_{5v} | C_{6v} | C_{7v} | C_{8v} |
| Image | 3 | 4 | 5 | 6 | | |
| Faces | 9+1 triangles | 12 triangles 1 squares | 15 triangles 1 pentagon | 18 triangles 1 hexagon | | |

== Special cases ==
There are three special case geometries of the diminished trigonal trapezohedron. The simplest is a diminished cube. The Chestahedron, named after artist Frank Chester, is constructed with equilateral triangles around the base, and the geometry adjusted so the kite faces have the same area as the equilateral triangles. The last can be seen by augmenting a regular tetrahedron and an octahedron, leaving 10 equilateral triangle faces, and then merging 3 sets of coparallel equilateral triangular faces into 3 (60 degree) rhombic faces. It can also be seen as a tetrahedron with 3 of 4 of its vertices rectified. The three rhombic faces fold out flat to form half of a hexagram.

Diminished trigonal trapezohedron variations
| Heptahedron topology #31 Diminished cube | Chestahedron (Equal area faces) | Augmented octahedron (Equilateral faces) |
|---|---|---|
| 3 squares 3 45-45-90 triangles 1 equilateral triangle face | 3 kite faces 3+1 equilateral triangle faces | 3 60 degree rhombic faces 3+1 equilateral triangle faces |

== See also ==
- Elongated pyramid
- Gyroelongated bipyramid
- Elongated bipyramid
- Gyroelongated pyramid
