= Gyroelongated pyramid =

Polyhedron formed by capping an antiprism with a pyramid

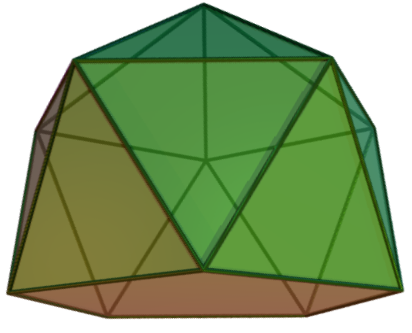
- Example pentagonal form
- Faces: 3n triangles 1 n-gon
- Edges: 5n
- Vertices: 2n + 1
- Symmetry group: C_{nv}, [n], (*nn)
- Rotation group: C_{n}, [n]^{+}, (nn)
- Properties: convex

In geometry, the gyroelongated pyramids (also called augmented antiprisms) are an infinite set of polyhedra, constructed by adjoining an n-gonal pyramid to an n-gonal antiprism.

There are two gyroelongated pyramids that are Johnson solids made from regular triangles, square, and pentagons. A triangular and hexagonal form can be constructed with coplanar faces. Others can be constructed allowing for isosceles triangles.

== Forms ==
Image	Name	Faces
	Gyroelongated triangular pyramid (Coplanar faces)	9+1 triangles
	Gyroelongated square pyramid (J10)	12 triangles, 1 squares
	Gyroelongated pentagonal pyramid (J11)	15 triangles, 1 pentagon
	Gyroelongated hexagonal pyramid (Coplanar faces)	18 triangles, 1 hexagon

== See also ==
- Gyroelongated bipyramid
- Elongated bipyramid
- Elongated pyramid
- Diminished trapezohedron
