= Triangular bifrustum =

Polyhedron created by truncating a triangular bipyramid

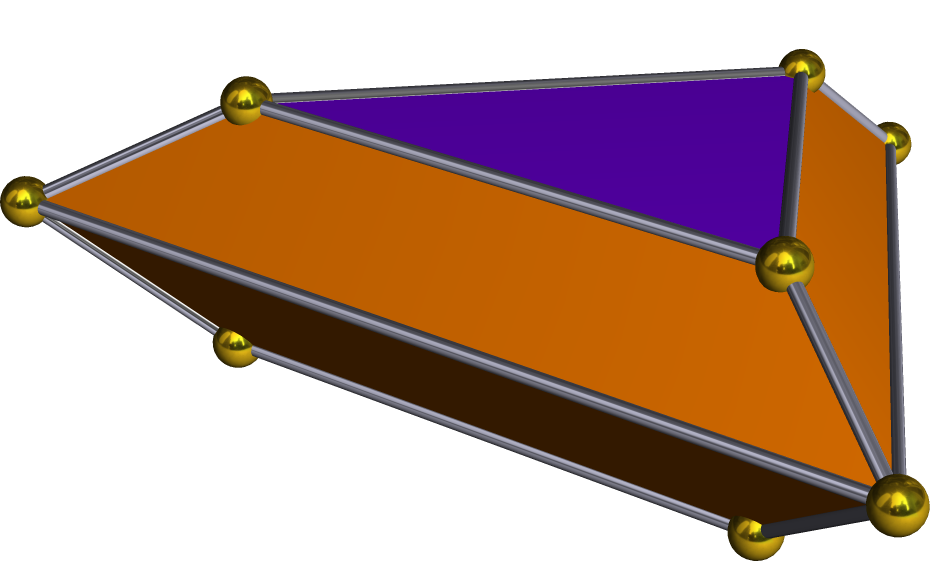
- Type: Bifrustum
- Faces: 6 trapezoids, 2 triangles
- Edges: 15
- Vertices: 9
- Symmetry group: D_{3h}
- Dual polyhedron: Elongated triangular bipyramid
- Properties: convex

Net
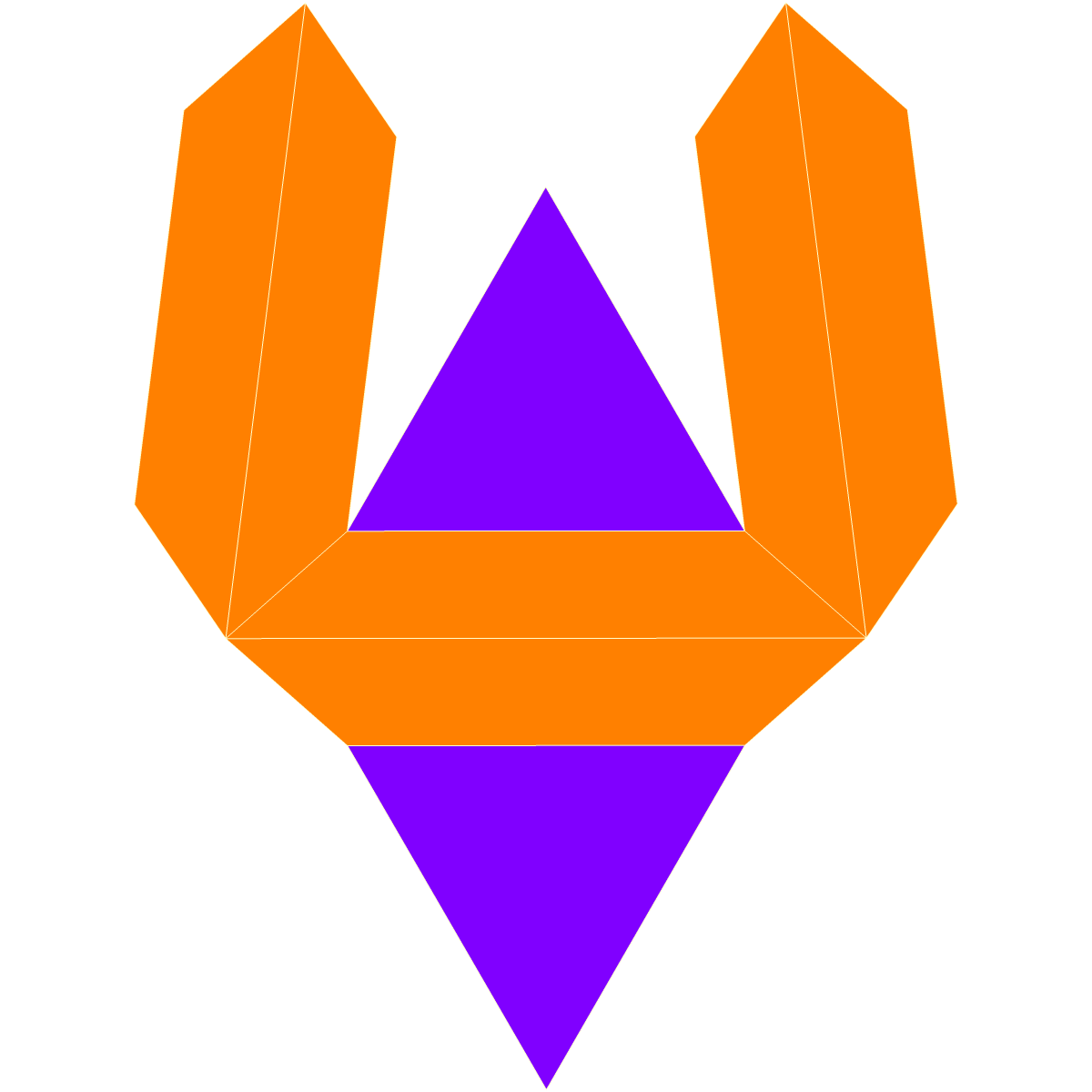

In geometry, the triangular bifrustum is the second in an infinite series of bifrustum polyhedra. It has 6 trapezoid and 2 triangle faces. It may also be called the truncated triangular bipyramid; however, that term is ambiguous, as it may also refer to polyhedra formed by truncating all five vertices of a triangular bipyramid.

This polyhedron can be constructed by taking a triangular bipyramid and truncating the polar axis vertices, making it into two end-to-end frustums. It appears as the form of certain nanocrystals.

A truncated triangular bipyramid can be constructed by connecting two stacked regular octahedra with 3 pairs of tetrahedra around the sides. This represents a portion of the gyrated alternated cubic honeycomb.

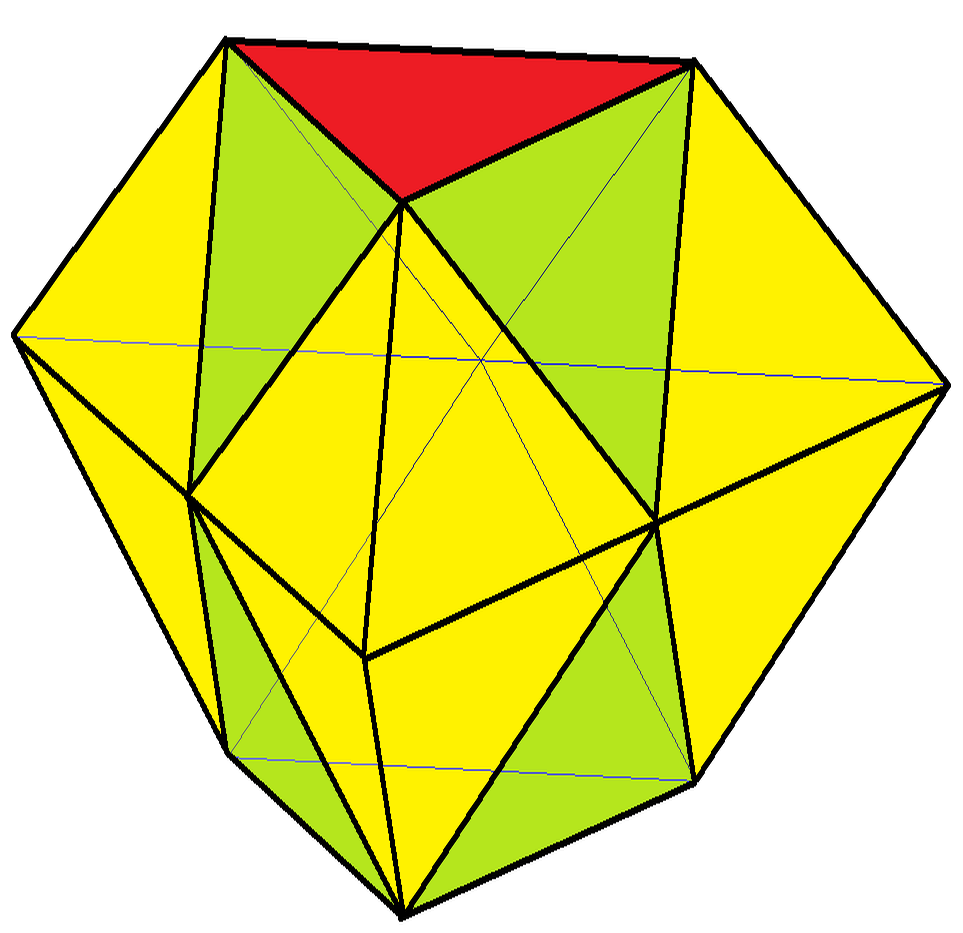
