= Heptahedron =

Polyhedron with seven sides

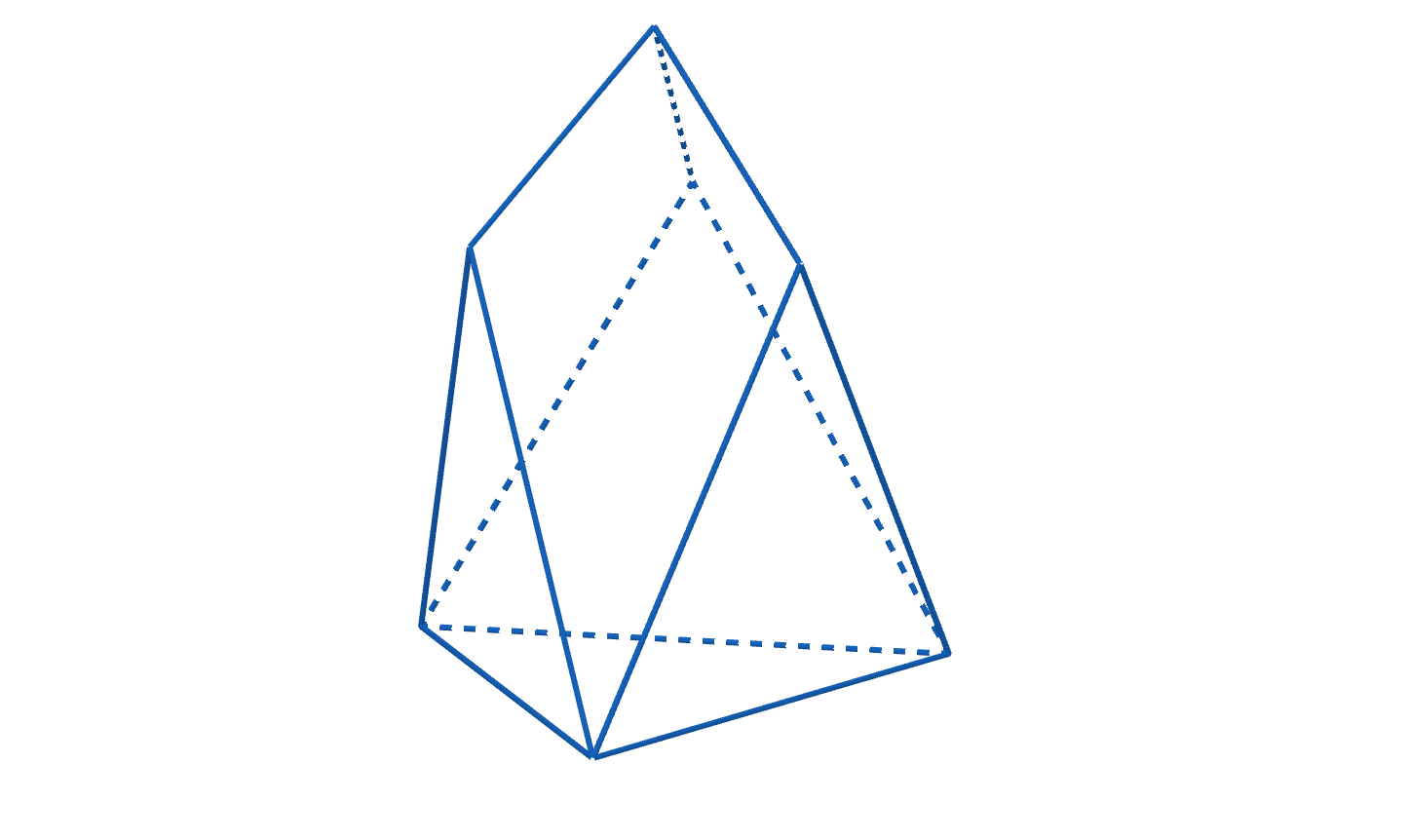
A Chestahedron, realized with 4 equilateral-triangle and 3 kite faces, all having the same area,

A heptahedron (pl.: heptahedra) is a polyhedron having seven sides, or faces.

A heptahedron can take a large number of different basic forms, or topologies. The most familiar are the hexagonal pyramid and the pentagonal prism. Also notable is the tetrahemihexahedron, which can be seen as a tessellation of the real projective plane. No heptahedra are regular.

== Topologically distinct heptahedron ==
=== Convex ===
There are 34 topologically distinct convex heptahedra, excluding mirror images. (Two polyhedra are "topologically distinct" if they have intrinsically different arrangements of faces and vertices, such that it is impossible to distort one into the other simply by changing the lengths of edges or the angles between edges or faces.)

An example of each type is depicted below, along with the number of sides on each of the faces. The images are ordered by descending number of six-sided faces (if any), followed by descending number of five-sided faces (if any), and so on.

Faces: 6,6,4,4,4,3,3; 10 vertices; 15 edges	Faces: 6,5,5,5,3,3,3; 10 vertices; 15 edges	Faces: 6,5,5,4,4,3,3; 10 vertices; 15 edges	Faces: 6,5,4,4,3,3,3; 9 vertices; 14 edges	Faces: 6,5,4,4,3,3,3; 9 vertices; 14 edges
Faces: 6,4,4,4,4,3,3; 9 vertices; 14 edges	Faces: 6,4,4,3,3,3,3; 8 vertices; 13 edges	Faces: 6,4,4,3,3,3,3; 8 vertices; 13 edges	Hexagonal pyramid: Faces: 6,3,3,3,3,3,3; 7 vertices; 12 edges	Faces: 5,5,5,4,4,4,3; 10 vertices; 15 edges
Faces: 5,5,5,4,3,3,3; 9 vertices; 14 edges	Faces: 5,5,5,4,3,3,3; 9 vertices; 14 edges	Pentagonal prism: Faces: 5,5,4,4,4,4,4; 10 vertices; 15 edges	Faces: 5,5,4,4,4,3,3; 9 vertices; 14 edges	Faces: 5,5,4,4,4,3,3; 9 vertices; 14 edges
Faces: 5,5,4,3,3,3,3; 8 vertices; 13 edges	Faces: 5,5,4,3,3,3,3; 8 vertices; 13 edges	Faces: 5,4,4,4,4,4,3; 9 vertices; 14 edges	Faces: 5,4,4,4,3,3,3; 8 vertices; 13 edges	Faces: 5,4,4,4,3,3,3; 8 vertices; 13 edges
Faces: 5,4,4,4,3,3,3; 8 vertices; 13 edges	Faces: 5,4,4,4,3,3,3; 8 vertices; 13 edges	Faces: 5,4,4,4,3,3,3; 8 vertices; 13 edges	Faces: 5,4,3,3,3,3,3; 7 vertices; 12 edges	Faces: 5,4,3,3,3,3,3; 7 vertices; 12 edges
Faces: 4,4,4,4,4,3,3; 8 vertices; 13 edges	Faces: 4,4,4,4,4,3,3; 8 vertices; 13 edges	Elongated triangular pyramid: Faces: 4,4,4,3,3,3,3; 7 vertices; 12 edges	Faces: 4,4,4,3,3,3,3; 7 vertices; 12 edges	Faces: 4,4,4,3,3,3,3; 7 vertices; 12 edges
Diminished cube: Faces: 4,4,4,3,3,3,3; 7 vertices; 12 edges	Faces: 4,4,4,3,3,3,3; 7 vertices; 12 edges	Faces: 4,3,3,3,3,3,3; 6 vertices; 11 edges	Faces: 4,3,3,3,3,3,3; 6 vertices; 11 edges	

=== Concave ===
Six topologically distinct concave heptahedra (excluding mirror images) can be formed by combining two tetrahedra in various configurations. The third, fourth and fifth of these have a face with collinear adjacent edges, and the sixth has a face that is not simply connected.
13 topologically distinct heptahedra (excluding mirror images) can be formed by cutting notches out of the edges of a triangular prism or square pyramid. Two examples are shown.	A variety of non-simply-connected heptahedra are possible. Two examples are shown.

The Szilassi polyhedron

One particularly interesting example is the Szilassi polyhedron, a toroidal polyhedron with 7 non-convex six sided faces.
