= Hexagonal bifrustum =

Polyhedron with 14 faces

Hexagonal Bifrustum
Hexagonal bifrustum
Type	Bifrustum
Faces	12 trapezoids, 2 hexagons
Edges	24
Vertices	18
Symmetry group	D_{6h}
Dual polyhedron	elongated hexagonal dipyramid
Properties	convex

The hexagonal bifrustum or truncated hexagonal bipyramid is the fourth in an infinite series of bifrustum polyhedra. It has 12 trapezoid and 2 hexagonal faces. This polyhedron can be constructed by taking a hexagonal dipyramid and truncating the polar axis vertices, making it into two end-to-end frustums.

Several types of crystal take this shape. It has also been used in the design of 14-sided dice, which may be used to generate randomly chosen playing cards.
