= Edge-contracted icosahedron =

Convex polyhedron with 18 triangular faces

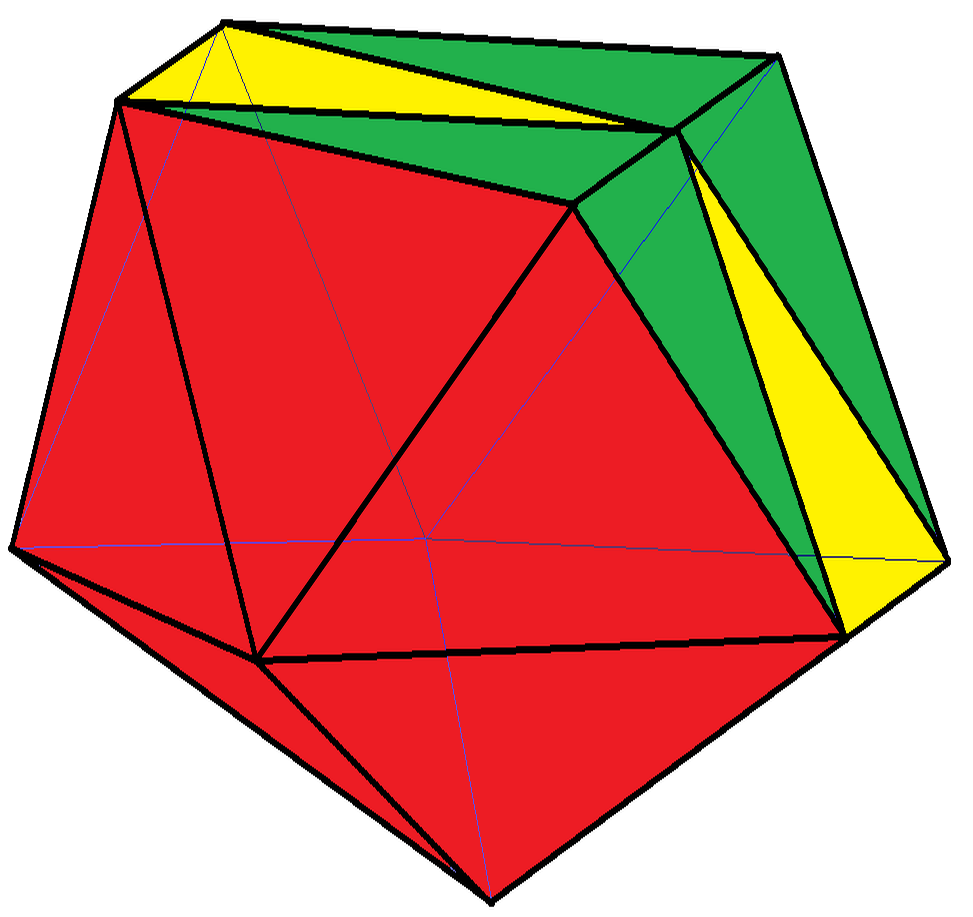
- Type: Octadecahedron
- Faces: 18 triangles
- Edges: 27
- Vertices: 11
- Vertex configuration: 2 (3^{4}); 8 (3^{5}); 1 (3^{6})
- Symmetry group: C_{2v}, [2], (*22), order 4
- Properties: Convex, deltahedron

Net
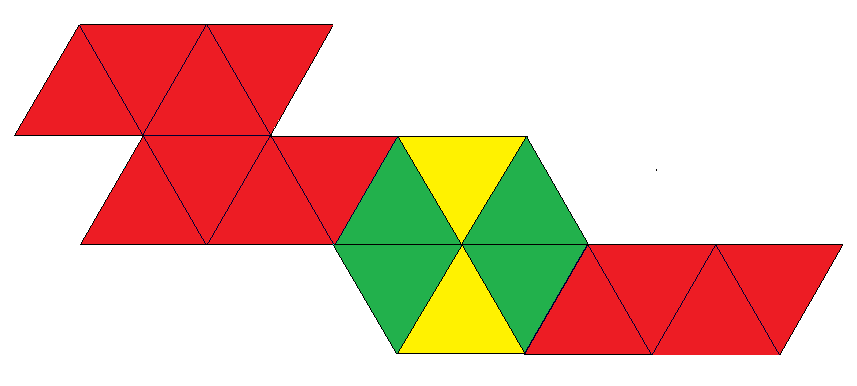

In geometry, an edge-contracted icosahedron is a polyhedron with 18 triangular faces, 27 edges, and 11 vertices.

== Construction ==
It can be constructed from the regular icosahedron, with one edge contraction, removing one vertex, 3 edges, and 2 faces. This contraction distorts the circumscribed sphere original vertices. With all equilateral triangle faces, it has 2 sets of 3 coplanar equilateral triangles (each forming a half-hexagon), and thus is not a Johnson solid.

If the sets of three coplanar triangles are considered a single face (called a triamond), it has 10 vertices, 22 edges, and 14 faces, 12 triangles and 2 triamonds.

It may also be described as having a hybrid square-pentagonal antiprismatic core (an antiprismatic core with one square base and one pentagonal base); each base is then augmented with a pyramid.

== Related polytopes ==
The dissected regular icosahedron is a variant topologically equivalent to the sphenocorona with the two sets of 3 coplanar faces as trapezoids. This is the vertex figure of a 4D polytope, grand antiprism. It has 10 vertices, 22 edges, and 12 equilateral triangular faces and 2 trapezoid faces.

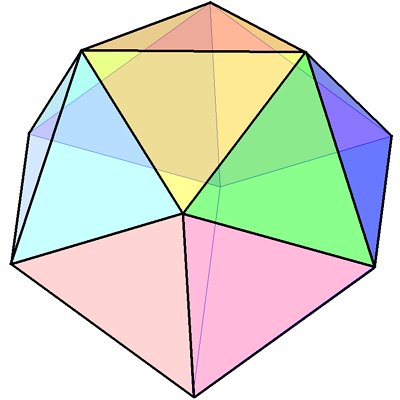

== In chemistry ==
In chemistry, this polyhedron is most commonly called the octadecahedron, for 18 triangular faces, and represents the closo-boranate [B_{11}H_{11}]^{2−}.

Ball-and-stick model of the closo-undecaborate ion, [B_{11}H_{11}]^{2−}	closo-boranate [B_{11}H_{11}]^{2−}	Net
