= Square orthobicupola =

28th Johnson solid (18 faces)

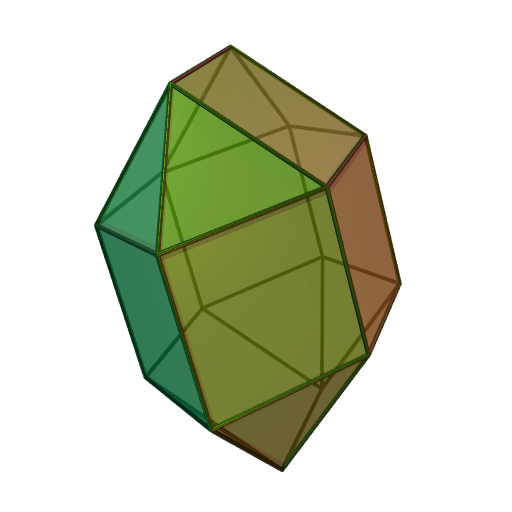
- Type: Johnson; J_{27} – J_{28} – J_{29}
- Faces: 8 triangles 2+8 squares
- Edges: 32
- Vertices: 16
- Vertex configuration: $8 \times (3^2 \times 4^2) + 8 \times (3 \times 4^3)$
- Symmetry group: $D_{4\mathrm{h}}$
- Properties: convex

Net

In geometry, the square orthobicupola is a Johnson solid constructed by two square cupolas base-to-base.

3D model of a square orthobicupola

== Construction ==
The square orthobicupola is started by attaching two square cupolae onto their bases. The resulting polyhedron consisted of eight equilateral triangles and ten squares, having eighteen faces in total, as well as thirty-two edges and sixteen vertices. A convex polyhedron in which the faces are all regular polygons is a Johnson solid, and the square orthobicupola is one of them, enumerated as twenty-eighth Johnson solid $J_{28}$. This construction is similar to the next one, the square gyrobicupola, which is twisted one of the cupolae around 45°.

== Properties ==
The square orthobicupola has surface area $A$ of a total sum of its area's faces, eight equilateral triangles and two squares. Its volume $V$ is twice that of the square cupola's volume. With the edge length $a$, they are:
$$\begin{align}
A &= \left(2 \cdot \sqrt{3} + 10\right)a^2 \approx 13.464a^2, \\
V &= \left(2+\frac{4\sqrt{2}}{3}\right)a^3 \approx 3.886a^3.
\end{align}$$

The square orthobicupola has an axis of symmetry (a line passing through the center of two cupolas at their top) that rotates around one-, two-, and third-fourth of a full turn, and is reflected over the plane so the appearance remains symmetrical. The solid is also symmetrical by reflection over three mutually orthogonal planes.
