= Elongated pentagonal pyramid =

9th Johnson solid (11 faces)

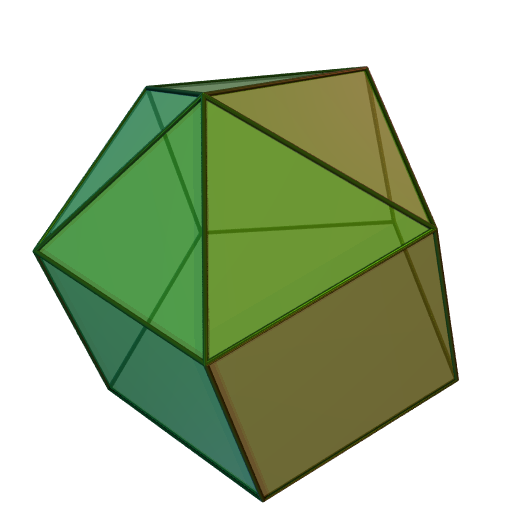
- Type: Johnson; J_{8} – J_{9} – J_{10}
- Faces: 5 triangles 5 squares 1 pentagon
- Edges: 20
- Vertices: 11
- Vertex configuration: 5(4^{2}.5); 5(3^{2}.4^{2}); 1(3^{5})
- Symmetry group: C_{5v}, [5], (*55)
- Rotation group: C_{5}, [5]^{+}, (55)
- Dual polyhedron: self-dual
- Properties: convex

Net

3D model of an elongated pentagonal pyramid

The elongated pentagonal pyramid is a polyhedron constructed by attaching one pentagonal pyramid onto one of the pentagonal prism's bases, a process known as elongation. It is an example of composite polyhedron. This construction involves the removal of one pentagonal face and replacing it with the pyramid. The resulting polyhedron has five equilateral triangles, five squares, and one pentagon as its faces. It remains convex, with the faces are all regular polygons, so the elongated pentagonal pyramid is Johnson solid, enumerated as the ninth Johnson solid $J_{9}$.

For edge length $\ell$, an elongated pentagonal pyramid has a surface area $A$ by summing the area of all faces, and volume $V$ by totaling the volume of a pentagonal pyramid's Johnson solid and regular pentagonal prism:
$$\begin{align}
A &= \frac{20 + 5\sqrt{3} + \sqrt{25 + 10\sqrt{5}}}{4}\ell^2 \approx 8.886\ell^2, \\
V &= \frac{5 + \sqrt{5} + 6\sqrt{25 + 10\sqrt{5}}}{24}\ell^3 \approx 2.022\ell^3.
\end{align}$$

The elongated pentagonal pyramid has a dihedral between its adjacent faces:

- the dihedral angle between adjacent squares is the internal angle of the prism's pentagonal base, 108°;
- the dihedral angle between the pentagon and a square is the right angle, 90°;
- the dihedral angle between adjacent triangles is that of a regular icosahedron, 138.19°; and
- the dihedral angle between a triangle and an adjacent square is the sum of the angle between those in a pentagonal pyramid and the angle between the base of and the lateral face of a prism, 127.37°.
