= Elongated square pyramid =

Polyhedron with cube and square pyramid

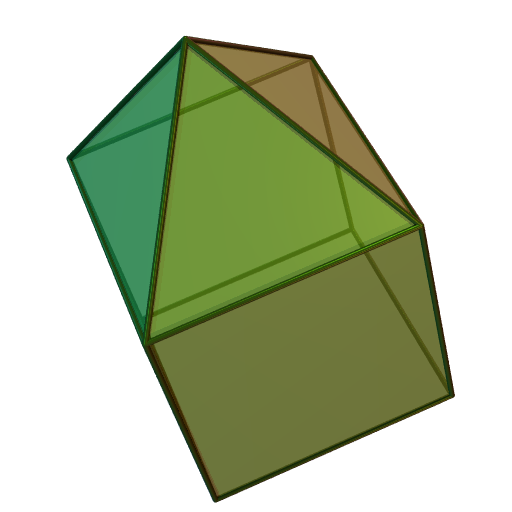
- Type: Johnson; J_{7} – J_{8} – J_{9}
- Faces: 4 triangles 1+4 squares
- Edges: 16
- Vertices: 9
- Vertex configuration: $4 \times (4^3)$ $1 \times (3^4)$ $4 \times (3^2 \times 4^2)$
- Symmetry group: $C_{4v}$
- Dihedral angle (degrees): triangle-to-triangle: 109.47°; square-to-square: 90°; triangle-to-square: 144.74°
- Dual polyhedron: self-dual
- Properties: convex, composite

Net

In geometry, the elongated square pyramid is a convex composite polyhedron constructed by attaching the square base of an equilateral square pyramid to one of the square faces of a cube; this is called an elongation of the pyramid. One square face of each parent body is thus hidden, leaving five squares and four equilateral triangles as faces of the composite. It is an example of a Johnson solid, a convex polyhedron whose faces are all regular, indexed as $J_8$.

== Properties ==
The height $h$ of an elongated square pyramid (i.e., the distance between the pyramid's apex and the plane of the farthest square) is the sum of the cube's side and the height of an equilateral square pyramid. Its surface area $A$ is the sum of four equilateral triangles and four squares' area. Its volume $V$ is the sum of an equilateral square pyramid and a cube's volume. With edge length $a$, the formulation for each is:
$$\begin{align}
h &= \left(1 + \frac{\sqrt{2}}{2}\right)a \approx 1.707a, \\
A &= \left(5 + \sqrt{3}\right)a^2 \approx 6.732a^2, \\
V &= \left(1 + \frac{\sqrt{2}}{6}\right)a^3 \approx 1.236a^3.
\end{align}$$

3D model of an elongated square pyramid

The elongated square pyramid has the same three-dimensional symmetry group as the equilateral square pyramid, the cyclic group $C_{4v}$ of order eight.

It has three kinds of dihedral angle:

- The dihedral angle between adjacent triangles is that of a regular octahedron (which can be seen as a square bipyramid), $\arccos(-1/3) \approx 109.47^\circ$.
- The dihedral angle between adjacent squares is that of a cube, $\pi/2 = 90^\circ$.
- In a square pyramid, the dihedral angle between the square base and a triangle side is $\arctan \left(\sqrt{2}\right) \approx 54.74^\circ$; thus in an elongated square pyramid the angle between a triangle and a square, on the edge where the pyramid attaches to the cube, is
  $$\arctan\left(\sqrt{2}\right) + \frac{\pi}{2} \approx 144.74^\circ.$$

== See also ==
- Elongated square bipyramid
