= Elongated triangular pyramid =

Triangular prism capped with a tetrahedron

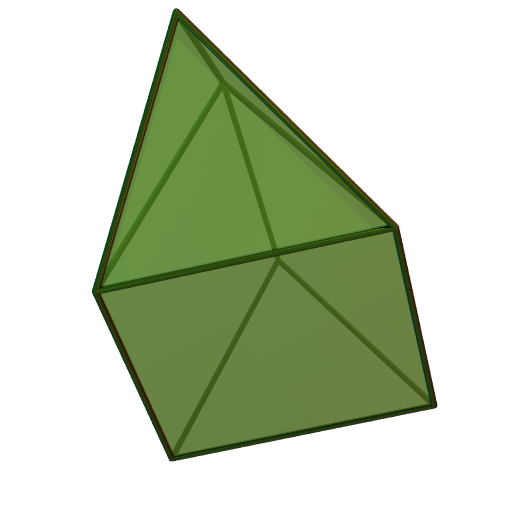
- Type: Johnson; J_{6} – J_{7} – J_{8}
- Faces: 4 triangles 3 squares
- Edges: 12
- Vertices: 7
- Vertex configuration: $$\begin{align} &1 \times (3^3) + \\ &3 \times (3 \times 4^2) + \\ &3 \times (3^2 \times 4^2) \end{align}$$
- Symmetry group: $C_{3\mathrm{v}}$ of order six
- Dihedral angle (degrees): triangle-to-triangle: 70.5°; square-to-square: 60°; square-to-triangle: 160.5°
- Dual polyhedron: self-dual
- Properties: convex, composite

Net

3D model of an elongated triangular pyramid

In geometry, the elongated triangular pyramid is one of the Johnson solids (J_{7}). As the name suggests, it can be constructed by elongating a tetrahedron by attaching a triangular prism to its base. Like any elongated pyramid, the resulting solid is topologically (but not geometrically) self-dual.

== Construction ==
The elongated triangular pyramid is constructed from a triangular prism by attaching regular tetrahedron onto one of its bases, a process known as elongation. The tetrahedron covers an equilateral triangle, replacing it with three other equilateral triangles, so that the resulting polyhedron has four equilateral triangles and three squares as its faces. A convex polyhedron in which all of the faces are regular polygons is called the Johnson solid, and the elongated triangular pyramid is among them, enumerated as the seventh Johnson solid $J_7$.

The elongated triangular pyramid is a composite polyhedron. That is, it can be sliced by a plane, producing a triangular prism and a regular tetrahedron. Slicing these polyhedra cannot produce any convex, regular-faced polyhedra, so they are elementary polyhedra.

== Properties ==
If the solid's edge length is $a$, then its height $h$ is the sum of the distance from any vertex to the centroid of a regular tetrahedron's base ($\sqrt{6}a/3$) and the height of a triangular prism ($a$):
$$h = a + \frac{\sqrt{6}}{3}a = \left(1 + \frac{\sqrt{6}}{3}\right)a \approx 1.816a.$$
Its surface area $A$ is the sum of the areas of four equilateral triangles and three squares:
$$A = 4\left(\frac{\sqrt{3}}{4}a^2\right) + 3a^2 = (\sqrt{3} + 3)a^2 = 5.598a^2.$$
Its volume $V$ can be calculated by slicing it into a regular tetrahedron and a prism, and then adding their volumes together:
$$V = \frac{\sqrt{2}}{12}a^3 + \frac{\sqrt{3}}{4}a^3 = \frac{\sqrt{2}+3\sqrt{3}}{12}a^3 = 0.551a^3.$$
The three-dimensional symmetry group of an elongated triangular pyramid is the cyclic group $C_{3\mathrm{v}}$ of order 6. It has four different dihedral angles (angles that are formed by two polygonal faces), whose measures can be calculated by adding the angles of the tetrahedron and the triangular prism:

- The angle between two adjacent triangles is the same as that of a regular tetrahedron: $\arccos (\frac{1}{3}) \approx 70.5^\circ$;
- The angle between two adjacent squares is the same as that of a triangular prism between two adjacent square faces: $\frac{\pi}{3} = 60^\circ$;
- The angle between a triangle and square is the same as that of a triangular prism's lateral square face to its triangular base: $\frac{\pi}{2} = 90^\circ$; and
- The angle between a triangle and a square, on the edge where a tetrahedron and a triangular prism are attached, is the sum of the triangle-to-triangle angle in a tetrahedron and square-to-triangle angle in a prism: $\arccos(\frac{1}{3}) + \frac{\pi}{2} \approx 160.5^\circ$.

The elongated triangular pyramid is topologically self-dual: if its faces are replaced with those faces' midpoints, and those points are joined by edges whenever the corresponding faces were joined by edges, then the result has the same connectivity as the original solid.

== See also ==
- Elongated triangular bipyramid – Triangular prism capped with tetrahedra
