= Gyroelongated square pyramid =

10th Johnson solid (13 faces)

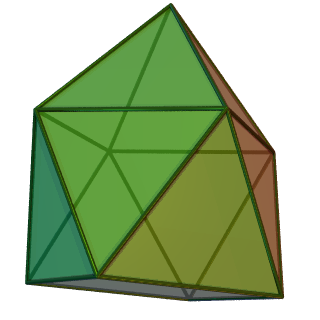
- Type: Johnson; J_{9} – J_{10} – J_{11}
- Faces: 12 triangles 1 square
- Edges: 20
- Vertices: 9
- Vertex configuration: $1 \times 3^4 + 4 \times 3^3 \times 4 + 4 \times 3^5$
- Symmetry group: $C_{4v}$
- Properties: convex, composite

Net
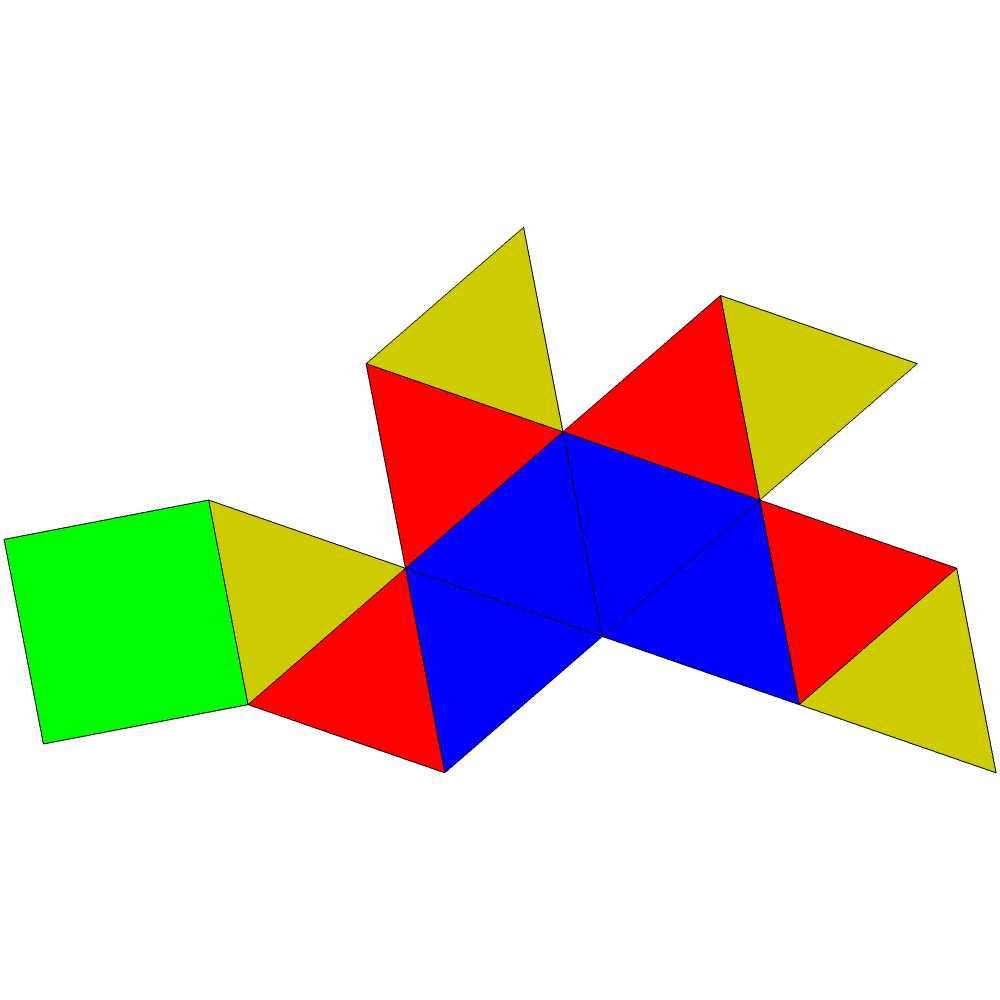

In geometry, the gyroelongated square pyramid is the Johnson solid that can be constructed by attaching an equilateral square pyramid to a square antiprism. It occurs in chemistry; for example, the capped square antiprismatic molecular geometry.

== Construction ==
The gyroelongated square pyramid can be constructed by attaching one equilateral square pyramid to the regular-faced square antiprism, a process known as gyroelongation. An equilateral square pyramid is a square pyramid made of a square base and four equilateral triangles, whereas a regular-faced square antiprism is composed of two squares joined by a "belt" of eight equilateral triangles. When constructing the solid, a square pyramid is attached to one of the antiprism's square bases, effectively replacing it with four equilateral triangles. Hence, the resulting polyhedron has twelve equilateral triangles and one square, for thirteen faces in total, twenty edges, and nine vertices. A nonuniform convex polyhedron where all faces are regular polygons is a Johnson solid, named after American mathematician Norman W. Johnson who listed the 92 such polyhedra. In his list, the gyroelongated square pyramid is enumerated as the tenth Johnson solid $J_{10}$.

The gyroelongated square pyramid is a composite polyhedron: that is, it can be cut by a plane into two regular-faced polyhedra; in this case, the only such way to cut the solid yields the square pyramid and square antiprism.

== Properties ==
The surface area of a gyroelongated square pyramid with edge length $a$ is:
$$\left(1 + 3\sqrt{3}\right)a^2 \approx 6.196a^2,$$
the area of twelve equilateral triangles and a square. Its volume:
$$\frac{\sqrt{2} + 2\sqrt{4 + 3\sqrt{2}}}{6}a^3 \approx 1.193a^3,$$
can be obtained by slicing the square pyramid and the square antiprism, after which adding their volumes.

3D model of a gyroelongated square pyramid

It has the same three-dimensional symmetry group as the square pyramid, the cyclic group $C_{4v}$ of order eight. Its dihedral angle can be derived by calculating the angle of a square pyramid and square antiprism in the following:

- the dihedral angle of an equilateral square pyramid between two adjacent triangles, approximately $109.47^\circ$
- the dihedral angle of a square antiprism between two adjacent triangles, approximately $127.55^\circ$, and between a triangle to its base is $103.83^\circ$
- the dihedral angle between two adjacent triangles, on the edge where an equilateral square pyramid is attached to a square antiprism, is $158.57^\circ$, for which by adding the dihedral angle of an equilateral square pyramid between its base and its lateral face $54.74^\circ$ and the dihedral angle of a square antiprism between two adjacent triangles.

== Applications ==
In stereochemistry, the capped square antiprismatic molecular geometry can be described as the atom cluster of the gyroelongated square pyramid. An example is [LaCl(H_{2}O)_{7}]^{4+}_{2}, a lanthanum(III) complex with a La–La bond.

== See also ==
- Gyroelongated square bipyramid, another Johnson solid made by two equilateral square pyramids and a square antiprism
