= Elongated pentagonal bipyramid =

16th Johnson solid; pentagonal prism capped by pyramids

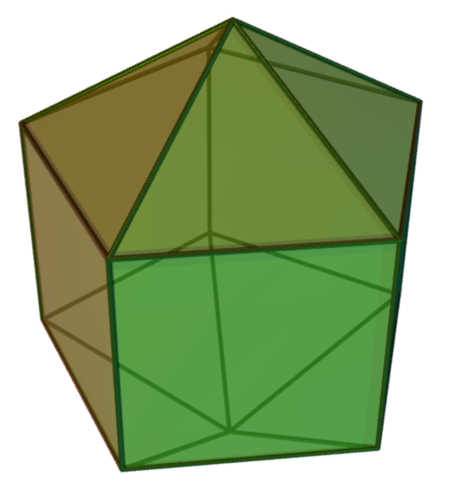
- Type: Johnson; J_{15} – J_{16} – J_{17}
- Faces: 10 triangles 5 squares
- Edges: 25
- Vertices: 12
- Vertex configuration: 10(3^{2}.4^{2}); 2(3^{5})
- Symmetry group: D_{5h}, [5,2], (*522)
- Rotation group: D_{5}, [5,2]^{+}, (522)
- Dual polyhedron: Pentagonal bifrustum
- Properties: convex

Net
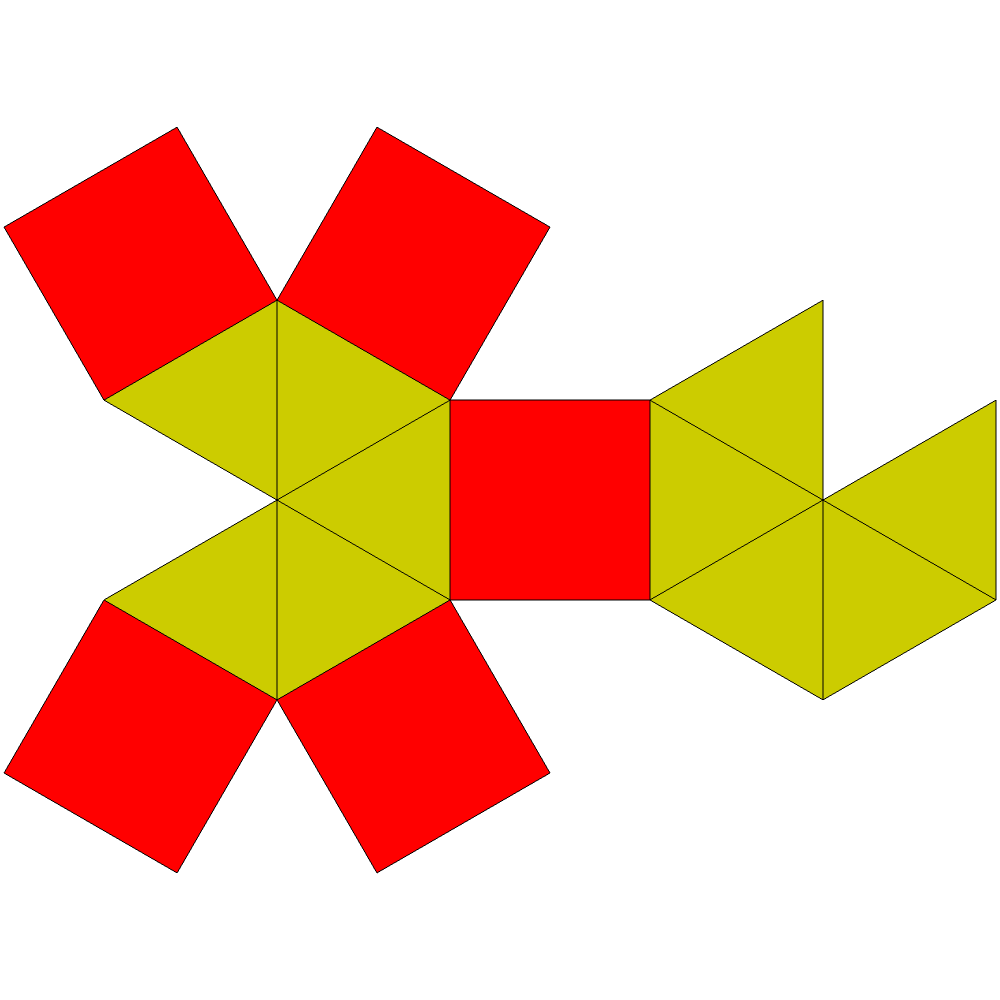

In geometry, the elongated pentagonal bipyramid or bicapped pentagonal prism is a polyhedron constructed by attaching two pentagonal pyramids onto the base of a pentagonal prism. It is an example of Johnson solid.

== Construction ==
The elongated pentagonal bipyramid is constructed from a pentagonal prism by attaching two pentagonal pyramids onto its bases, a process called elongation. These pyramids cover the pentagonal faces so that the resulting polyhedron ten equilateral triangles and five squares. A convex polyhedron in which all of the faces are regular polygons is the Johnson solid. The elongated pentagonal bipyramid is among them, enumerated as the sixteenth Johnson solid $J_{16}$.

== Properties ==
The surface area of an elongated pentagonal bipyramid $A$ is the sum of all polygonal faces' area: ten equilateral triangles, and five squares. Its volume $V$ can be ascertained by dissecting it into two pentagonal pyramids and one regular pentagonal prism and then adding its volume. Given an elongated pentagonal bipyramid with edge length $a$, they can be formulated as:
$$\begin{align}
A &= \frac{5}{2} \left(2+\sqrt{3}\right)a^2 \approx 9.330a^2, \\
V &= \frac{1}{12} \left(5+\sqrt{5}+3 \sqrt{5 \left(5+2 \sqrt{5}\right)}\right)a^3 \approx 2.324a^3.
\end{align}$$

3D model of an elongated pentagonal bipyramid

It has the same three-dimensional symmetry group as the pentagonal prism, the dihedral group $D_{5\mathrm{h}}$ of order 20. Its dihedral angle can be calculated by adding the angle of the pentagonal pyramid and pentagonal prism:

- the dihedral angle of an elongated pentagonal bipyramid between two adjacent triangular faces is that of a pentagonal pyramid between those, 138.19°.
- the dihedral angle of an elongated pentagonal bipyramid between two adjacent square faces is that of a regular pentagonal prism, the internal angle of a regular pentagon, 108°.
- the dihedral angle of an elongated pentagonal bipyramid between square-to-triangle is the sum of the dihedral angle of a pentagonal pyramid between triangle-to-pentagon with that of a pentagonal prism between square-to-pentagon, 37.38° + 90° = 127.38°.

The dual of the elongated square bipyramid is a pentagonal bifrustum.
