= Elongated triangular bipyramid =

Triangular prism capped with tetrahedra

- Type: Johnson; J_{13} – J_{14} – J_{15}
- Faces: 6 triangles 3 squares
- Edges: 15
- Vertices: 8
- Vertex configuration: $2 \times (3^3) + 6 \times (3^2 \times 4^2)$
- Symmetry group: $D_{3\mathrm{h}}$ of order 12
- Properties: convex, composite

Net

The elongated triangular bipyramid or elongated triangular dipyramid is a polyhedron constructed from a triangular prism by attaching two regular tetrahedra to its bases. It is one of the Johnson solids and a composite polyhedron. This polyhedron is found in the African musical instrument nirrosula and the raphide crystal structure in plants.

== Construction ==
The elongated triangular bipyramid is constructed from a triangular prism by attaching two regular tetrahedra to its triangular bases. Such a process known as elongation. The triangular prism is uniform (that is, the solid's symmetry maps each vertex to every other vertex), and made of two equilateral triangular bases and three lateral square faces. When two regular tetrahedra cover the bases of a prism, the resulting polyhedron has six equilateral triangles and three squares (nine faces in total), fifteen edges, and eight vertices. The elongated triangular bipyramid is a Johnson solid, named after American mathematician Norman Johnson who listed the 92 convex polyhedra with regular polygonal faces. The elongated triangular bipyramid is enumerated as the fourteenth Johnson solid $J_{14}$. It is a composite polyhedron, because it can be sliced by a plane to produce convex, regular-faced polyhedra, namely a triangular prism and regular tetrahedra.

== Properties ==
If the solid's edge-length is $a$, then its height $h$ is the sum of twice the distance from a vertex to the centroid of a triangular face in a tetrahedron ($\sqrt{6}a/3$) and the height of a triangular prism ($a$):
$$h = \frac{\sqrt{6}}{3}a + \frac{\sqrt{6}}{3}a + a = \left(\frac{2\sqrt{6}}{3} + 1\right)a \approx 2.633a.$$
The surface area $A$ of an elongated triangular bipyramid is the sum of the areas of its polygonal faces, which are six equilateral triangles and three squares:
$$A = 6\left(\frac{\sqrt{3}}{4}a^2\right) + 3a^2 = \left(\frac{3\sqrt{3}}{2} + 3\right)a^2 \approx 5.598a^2.$$
The volume of an elongated triangular bipyramid is the sum of twice the volume of a tetrahedron and triangular prism:
$$V = \frac{\sqrt{2}}{12}a^3 + \frac{\sqrt{2}}{12}a^3 + \frac{\sqrt{3}}{4}a^3 = \left(\frac{\sqrt{2}}{6} + \frac{\sqrt{3}}{4} \right) a^3 \approx 0.669a^3.$$

3D model of an elongated triangular bipyramid

The elongated triangular bipyramid has the same three-dimensional symmetry group as the triangular prism, the three-fold prismatic symmetry $D_{3 \mathrm{h}}$ of order twelve. It has an axis of threefold rotational symmetry (0°, 120°, 240°) through the apexes of the pyramids, three planes of mirror symmetry containing that axis, and a fourth plane of mirror symmetry perpendicular to that axis and passing through the solid's centroid.

The dihedral angles of an elongated triangular bipyramid can be calculated by adding the angles of the tetrahedron and the triangular prism:

- its dihedral angle between two adjacent triangular faces is that angle of a tetrahedron between two adjacent triangular faces: $\arccos(\frac{1}{3}) \approx 70.5^\circ$;
- its dihedral angle between a square and a triangle is the sum of a triangular prism's square-to-triangle angle and a tetrahedron's triangle-to-triangle angle: $\arccos(\frac{1}{3}) + \frac{\pi}{2} \approx 160.5^\circ$;
- the dihedral angle between two squares is that angle of a triangular prism's square-to-triangle, the internal angle of an equilateral triangle, $\frac{\pi}{3} = 60^\circ$.

== Appearances ==
The nirrosula, an African musical instrument woven out of strips of plant leaves, is made in the form of a series of elongated bipyramids, although there are non-equilateral-triangular faces of their end caps.

The elongated triangular bipyramid, together with the helicoid, is commonly found in the micromorphological structure of raphides, needle-shape crystals made of calcium oxalate in plants. These structures are specialized to regulate the products of metabolic activities by transmitting, storing, and making them functionable, depending on the shapes.

== See also ==
- Elongated triangular pyramid – Johnson solid constructed from a triangular prism and regular tetrahedron
