= Pseudo-uniform polyhedron =

A pseudo-uniform polyhedron is a polyhedron which has regular polygons as faces and has the same vertex configuration at all vertices but is not vertex-transitive: it is not true that for any two vertices, there exists a symmetry of the polyhedron mapping the first isometrically onto the second. Thus, although all the vertices of a pseudo-uniform polyhedron appear the same, it is not isogonal. They are called pseudo-uniform polyhedra due to their resemblance to some true uniform polyhedra.

There are two known pseudo-uniform polyhedra: the pseudorhombicuboctahedron and the pseudo-great rhombicuboctahedron. It is not known if there are any others; Branko Grünbaum conjectured that there are not, but thought that a proof would be "probably quite complicated". They both have D_{4d} symmetry, the same symmetry as a square antiprism. They can both be constructed from a uniform polyhedron by twisting one cupola-shaped cap.

== The pseudo-uniform polyhedra ==
=== Pseudorhombicuboctahedron ===
The pseudorhombicuboctahedron is the only convex pseudo-uniform polyhedron. It is also a Johnson solid (J_{37}) and can also be called the elongated square gyrobicupola. Its dual is the pseudo-deltoidal icositetrahedron. As the name suggests, it can be constructed by elongating a square gyrobicupola (J_{29}) and inserting an octagonal prism between its two halves. The resulting solid is locally vertex-regular — the arrangement of the four faces incident on any vertex is the same for all vertices; this is unique among the Johnson solids. However, it is not vertex-transitive, and consequently not one of the Archimedean solids, as there are pairs of vertices such that there is no isometry of the solid which maps one into the other. Essentially, the two types of vertices can be distinguished by their "neighbors of neighbors." Another way to see that the polyhedron is not vertex-regular is to note that there is exactly one belt of eight squares around its equator, which distinguishes vertices on the belt from vertices on either side.

Rhombicuboctahedron	Exploded sections	Pseudo-rhombicuboctahedron

The solid can also be seen as the result of twisting one of the square cupolae (J_{4}) on a rhombicuboctahedron (one of the Archimedean solids; a.k.a. the elongated square orthobicupola) by 45 degrees. Its similarity to the rhombicuboctahedron gives it the alternative name pseudorhombicuboctahedron. It has occasionally been referred to as "the fourteenth Archimedean solid".

With faces colored by its D_{4d} symmetry, it can look like this:

pseudorhombicuboctahedron	Pseudo-deltoidal icositetrahedron Dual polyhedron
net	

There are 8 (green) squares around its equator, 4 (red) triangles and 4 (yellow) squares above and below, and one (blue) square on each pole.

The construction of the uniform and pseudo rhombicuboctahedra can be seen in the following augmentations of the octagonal prism:

The octagonal prism (coloured with D_{8h} symmetry)...	...with one of the octagons augmented with a square cupola.	There are two choices on the orientation of the other non-crossed square cupola. One aligns corresponding faces (triangles with triangles, squares with squares) and produces the rhombicuboctahedron. This construction has D_{4h} symmetry, although the rhombicuboctahedron has full octahedral symmetry.	The other choice aligns noncorresponding faces (triangles with squares) and produces the pseudorhombicuboctahedron. This construction has D_{4d} symmetry.

=== Pseudo-great rhombicuboctahedron ===
The uniform nonconvex great rhombicuboctahedron may be seen as an octagrammic prism with the octagrams excavated with crossed square cupolae, similarly to how the rhombicuboctahedron may be seen as an octagonal prism with the octagons augmented with square cupolae. Rotating one of the cupolae in this construction results in the pseudo-great rhombicuboctahedron.

Crossed square cupola	Nonconvex great rhombicuboctahedron	Pseudo-great rhombicuboctahedron

The pictures below show the excavation of the octagrammic prism with crossed square cupolae taking place one step at a time. The crossed square cupolae are always red, while the square sides of the octagrammic prism are in the other colours. All images are oriented approximately the same way for clarity.

The octagrammic prism (coloured with D_{8h} symmetry)...	...with one of the octagrams (here, the top one) excavated with a crossed square cupola. This may be termed the retroelongated crossed square cupola or augmented octagrammic prism, and is isomorphic to the Johnson elongated square cupola.	There are two choices on the orientation of the other crossed square cupola. One aligns corresponding faces (triangles with triangles, squares with squares) and produces the nonconvex great rhombicuboctahedron. This construction has D_{4h} symmetry, although the nonconvex great rhombicuboctahedron has full octahedral symmetry.	The other choice aligns noncorresponding faces (triangles with squares) and produces the pseudo-great rhombicuboctahedron (or pseudoquasirhombicuboctahedron). This construction has D_{4d} symmetry.

The pseudo great rhombicuboctahedron has a single "belt" of squares around its equator, and can be constructed by twisting one of the crossed square cupolae on a nonconvex great rhombicuboctahedron by 45 degrees. This is analogous to the pseudorhombicuboctahedron.

== Duals of the pseudo-uniform polyhedra ==
The duals of the pseudo-uniform polyhedra have all faces congruent, but not transitive: their faces do not all lie within the same symmetry orbit and they are thus not isohedral. This is a consequence of the pseudo-uniform polyhedra having the same vertex configuration at every vertex, but not being vertex-transitive. This is demonstrated by the different colours used for the faces in the images of the dual pseudo-uniform polyhedra in this article, denoting different types of faces.

=== Pseudo-deltoidal icositetrahedron ===
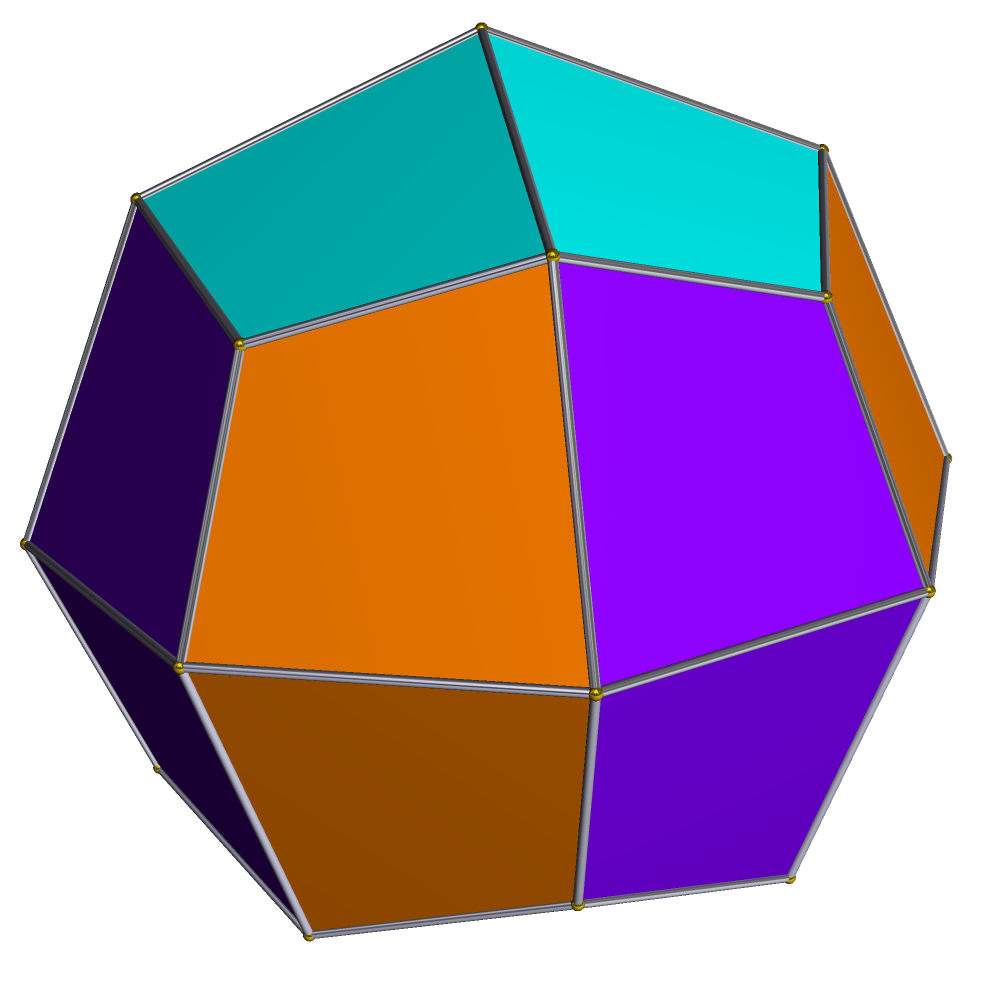

=== Pseudo-great deltoidal icositetrahedron ===
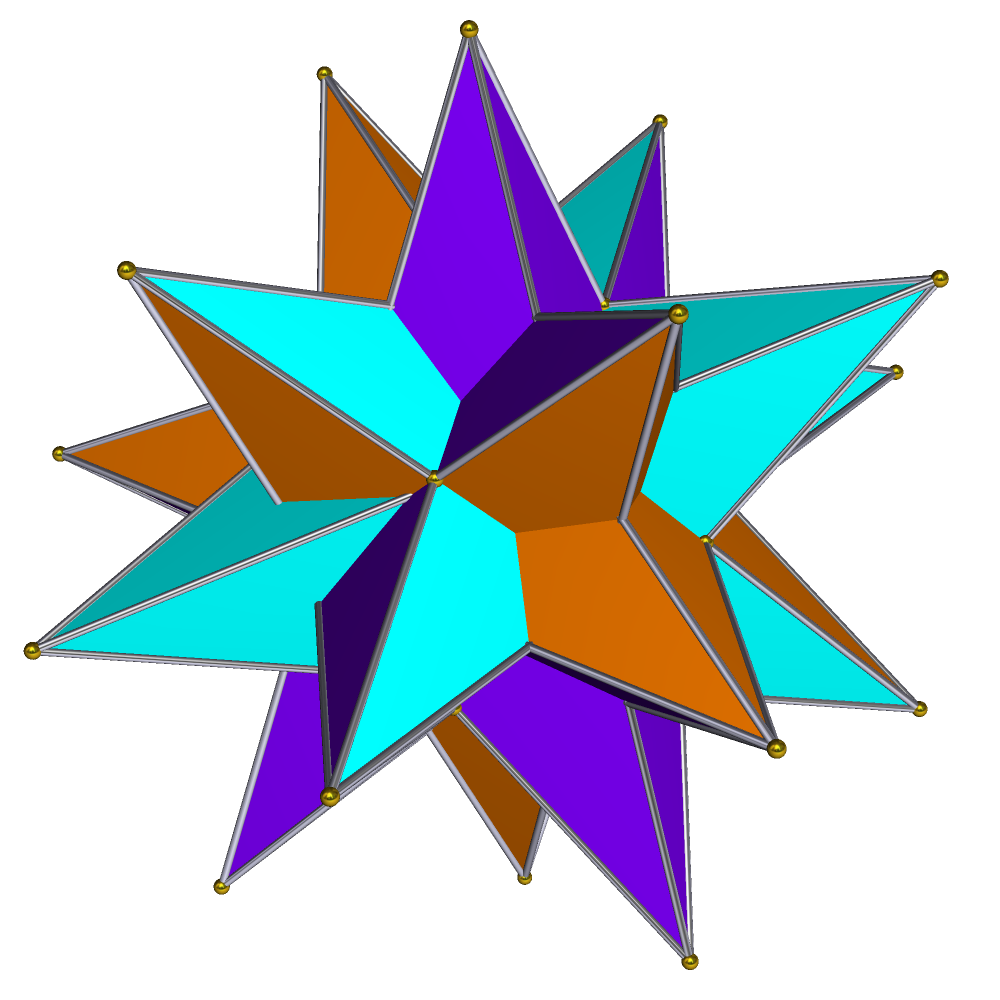
