= Pseudo great rhombicuboctahedron =

Pseudo great rhombicuboctahedron
Pseudo-great rhombicuboctahedron
Type	Pseudo uniform polyhedron, Star polyhedron
Elements	F = 26, E = 48; V = 24 (χ = 2)
Faces by sides	8{3}+(8+8+2){4}
Symmetry group	D_{4d}
Properties	singular vertex figure
4.4.4.3/2; Vertex figure	Pseudo great deltoidal icositetrahedron (dual polyhedron)

In geometry, the pseudo great rhombicuboctahedron is one of the two pseudo uniform polyhedra, the other being the convex elongated square gyrobicupola or pseudo rhombicuboctahedron. It has the same vertex figure as the nonconvex great rhombicuboctahedron (a uniform polyhedron), but is not a uniform polyhedron (due to not being isogonal), and has a smaller symmetry group. It can be obtained from the great rhombicuboctahedron by taking a square face and the 8 faces with a common vertex to it (forming a crossed square cupola) and rotating them by an angle of π/4. It is related to the nonconvex great rhombicuboctahedron in the same way that the pseudo rhombicuboctahedron is related to the rhombicuboctahedron.

== Related polyhedra ==
The pseudo-great rhombicuboctahedron may also be termed an elongated crossed square gyrobicupola, in analogy to the name of the elongated square gyrobicupola.

Great rhombicuboctahedron	Pseudo great rhombicuboctahedron
