= Great rhombihexahedron =

Polyhedron with 18 faces

Great rhombihexahedron
Type	Uniform star polyhedron
Elements	F = 18, E = 48; V = 24 (χ = −6)
Faces by sides	12{4}+6{8/3}
Coxeter diagram	(with extra double-covered triangles) (with extra double-covered squares)
Wythoff symbol	2 4/3 (3/2 4/2) |
Symmetry group	O_{h}, [4,3], *432
Index references	U_{21}, C_{82}, W_{103}
Dual polyhedron	Great rhombihexacron
Vertex figure	4.8/3.4/3.8/5
Bowers acronym	Groh

3D model of a great rhombihexahedron

In geometry, the great rhombihexahedron (or great rhombicube) is a nonconvex uniform polyhedron, indexed as U_{21}. It has 18 faces (12 squares and 6 octagrams), 48 edges, and 24 vertices. Its dual is the great rhombihexacron. Its vertex figure is a crossed quadrilateral.

== Orthogonal projections ==
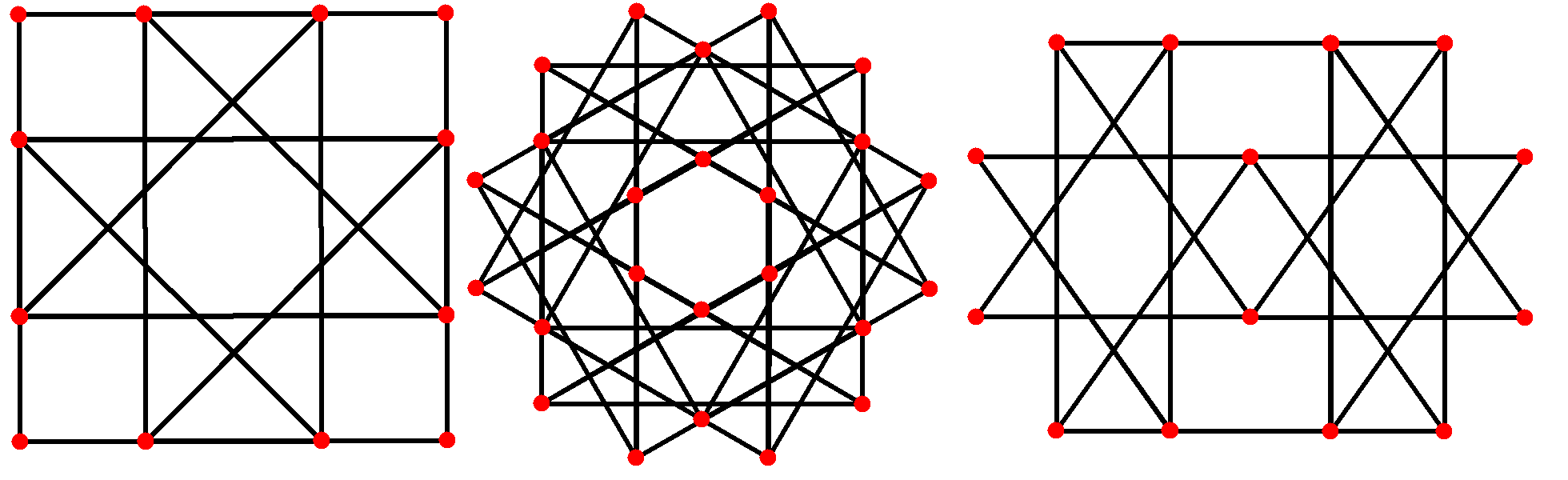

== Gallery ==
Traditional filling	Modulo-2 filling

== Related polyhedra ==
It shares the vertex arrangement with the convex truncated cube. It additionally shares its edge arrangement with the nonconvex great rhombicuboctahedron (having 12 square faces in common), and with the great cubicuboctahedron (having the octagrammic faces in common).

Truncated cube	Nonconvex great rhombicuboctahedron	Great cubicuboctahedron	Great rhombihexahedron

It may be constructed as the exclusive or (blend) of three octagrammic prisms. Similarly, the small rhombihexahedron may be constructed as the exclusive or of three octagonal prisms.

=== Great rhombihexacron ===
Great rhombihexacron
Type	Star polyhedron
Face	
Elements	F = 24, E = 48; V = 18 (χ = −6)
Symmetry group	O_{h}, [4,3], *432
Index references	DU_{21}
dual polyhedron	Great rhombihexahedron

3D model of a great rhombihexacron

The great rhombihexacron is a nonconvex isohedral polyhedron. It is the dual of the uniform great rhombihexahedron (U_{21}). It has 24 identical bow-tie-shaped faces, 18 vertices, and 48 edges.

It has 12 outer vertices which have the same vertex arrangement as the cuboctahedron, and 6 inner vertices with the vertex arrangement of an octahedron.

As a surface geometry, it can be seen as visually similar to a Catalan solid, the disdyakis dodecahedron, with much taller rhombus-based pyramids joined to each face of a rhombic dodecahedron.

== See also ==
- List of uniform polyhedra
