= Stellated truncated hexahedron =

Polyhedron with 14 faces

Stellated truncated hexahedron
Type	Uniform star polyhedron
Elements	F = 14, E = 36; V = 24 (χ = 2)
Faces by sides	8{3}+6{8/3}
Coxeter diagram	
Wythoff symbol	2 3 | 4/3; 2 3/2 | 4/3
Symmetry group	O_{h}, [4,3], *432
Index references	U_{19}, C_{66}, W_{92}
Dual polyhedron	Great triakis octahedron
Vertex figure	3.8/3.8/3
Bowers acronym	Quith

3D model of a stellated truncated hexahedron

In geometry, the stellated truncated hexahedron (or quasitruncated hexahedron, and stellatruncated cube) is a uniform star polyhedron, indexed as U_{19}. It has 14 faces (8 triangles and 6 octagrams), 36 edges, and 24 vertices. It is represented by Schläfli symbol t'{4,3} or t{4/3,3}, and Coxeter-Dynkin diagram,. It is sometimes called quasitruncated hexahedron because it is related to the truncated cube,, except that the square faces become inverted into {8/3} octagrams.

Even though the stellated truncated hexahedron is a stellation of the truncated hexahedron, its core is a regular octahedron.

== Orthographic projections ==
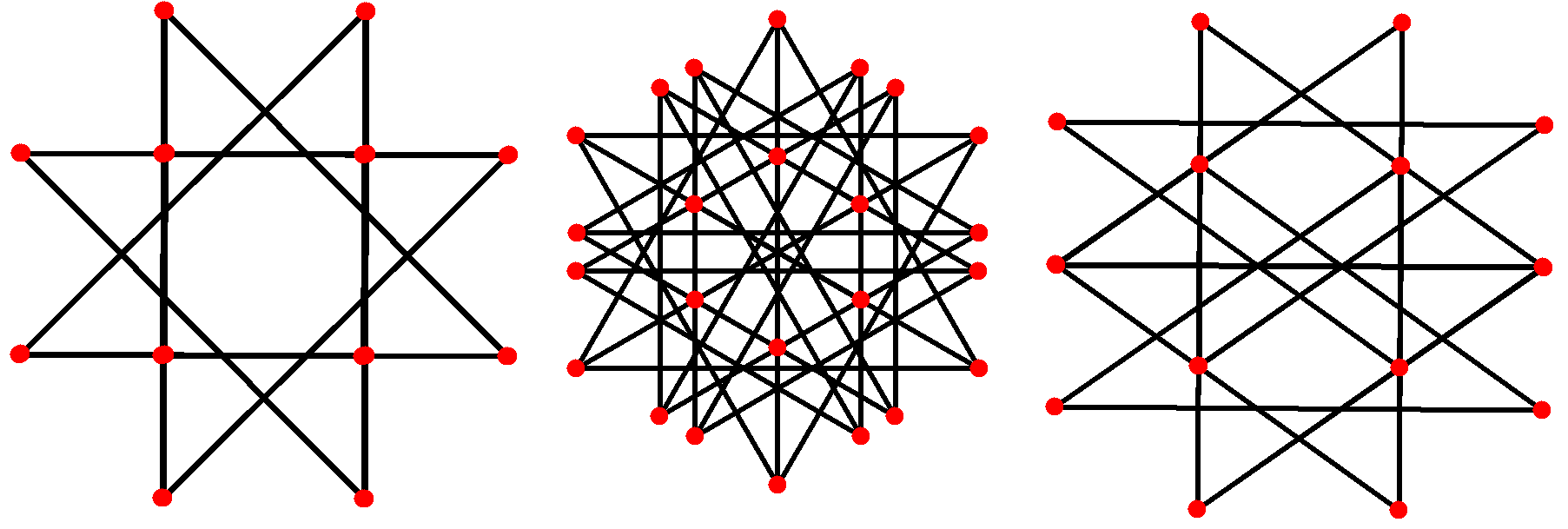

== Related polyhedra ==
It shares the vertex arrangement with three other uniform polyhedra: the convex rhombicuboctahedron, the small rhombihexahedron, and the small cubicuboctahedron.

Rhombicuboctahedron	Small cubicuboctahedron	Small rhombihexahedron	Stellated truncated hexahedron

== See also ==
- List of uniform polyhedra
