= Dyakis dodecahedron =

Non-uniform polyhedron with 24 chiral trapezoid faces

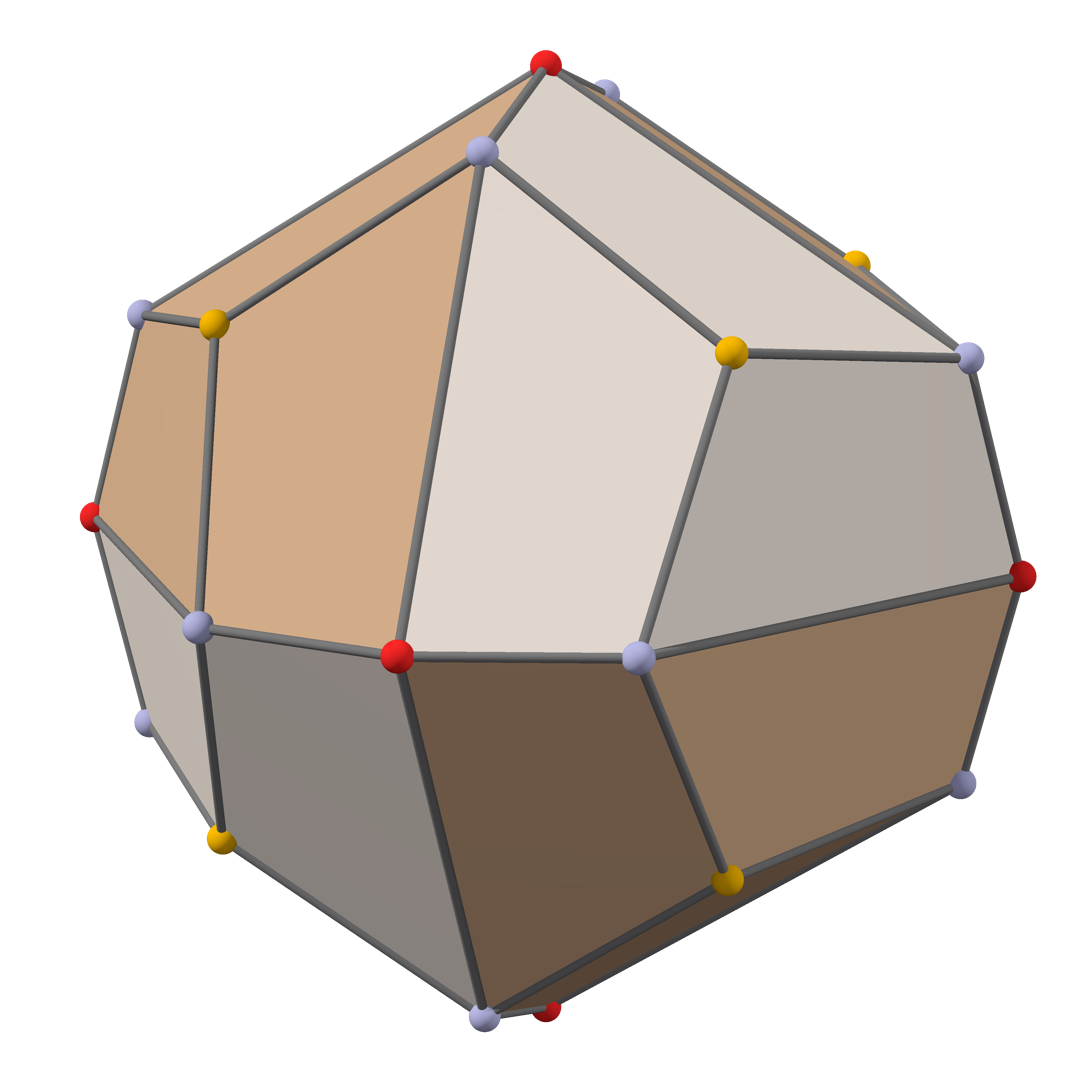
- Type: non-uniform polyhedron
- Faces: 24 congruent chiral quadrilaterals with 2 unequal acute angles & 2 unequal obtuse angles
- Edges: 48
- Vertices: 26
- Symmetry group: Pyritohedral
- Dual polyhedron: Cantic snub octahedron
- Properties: convex, face-transitive

Net

3D model of a dyakis dodecahedron

In geometry, the dyakis dodecahedron /ˈdʌɪəkɪsˌdəʊdɪkəˈhiːdrən/ or diploid is a variant of the deltoidal icositetrahedron with pyritohedral symmetry, transforming the kite faces into chiral quadrilaterals. The name diploid derives from the Greek word διπλάσιος (diplásios), meaning twofold since it has 2-fold symmetry along its 6 octahedral vertices. It has the same number of faces, edges, and vertices as the deltoidal icositetrahedron as they are topologically identical.

== Construction ==
The dyakis dodecahedron can be constructed by enlarging 24 of the 48 faces of the disdyakis dodecahedron and is inscribed in the dyakis dodecahedron, thus it exists as a hemihedral form of it with indices {hkl}. It can be constructed into two non-regular pentagonal dodecahedra, the pyritohedron and the tetartoid. The transformation to the pyritohedron can be made by combining two adjacent trapezoids that share a long edge together into one hexagon face. The short edges of the hexagon can then be combined to finally get the pentagon. The transformation to the tetartoid can be made by enlarging 12 of the dyakis dodecahedron's 24 faces.

== Properties ==
Since the quadrilaterals are chiral and non-regular, the dyakis dodecahedron is a non-uniform polyhedron, a type of polyhedron that is not vertex-transitive and does not have regular polygon faces. It is an isohedron, meaning that it is face transitive.

The dual polyhedron of a dyakis dodecahedron is the cantic snub octahedron.

== In crystallography ==
The dyakis dodecahedron only exists in one crystal, pyrite. Pyrite has other forms other than the dyakis dodecahedron, including tetrahedra, octahedra, cubes and pyritohedra. Though the cube and octahedron are in the cubic crystal system, the dyakis dodecahedron and the pyritohedron are in the isometric crystal system and the tetrahedron is in the tetrahedral crystal system. Although the dyakis dodecahedron has 3-fold axes like the pyritohedron and cube, it doesn't have 4-fold axes, rather it has order-4 vertices, as when the dyakis dodecahedron is rotated 90 or 270° along an order-4 vertex, it is not the same as before, because the order-4 vertices act as 2-fold axes, as when they are rotated a full turn or 180°, the polyhedron looks the same as before.
