= J67 =

J67 may refer to:

- Biaugmented truncated cube
- LNER Class J67, a British steam locomotive class
- Wright J67, a turbojet engine
