= Great rhombicuboctahedron =

In geometry, this may refer to:

1. Truncated cuboctahedron - an Archimedean solid, with Schläfli symbol tr{4,3}, and Coxeter diagram.
2. Nonconvex great rhombicuboctahedron - a uniform star polyhedron, with Schläfli symbol r{4,3/2}, and Coxeter diagram.
