= Great cubicuboctahedron =

Nonconvex uniform polyhedron with 20 faces

Great cubicuboctahedron
Type	Uniform star polyhedron
Elements	F = 20, E = 48; V = 24 (χ = −4)
Faces by sides	8{3}+6{4}+6{8/3}
Coxeter diagram	
Wythoff symbol	3 4 | 4/3; 4 3/2 | 4
Symmetry group	O_{h}, [4,3], *432
Index references	U_{14}, C_{50}, W_{77}
Dual polyhedron	Great hexacronic icositetrahedron
Vertex figure	3.8/3.4.8/3
Bowers acronym	Gocco

3D model of a great cubicuboctahedron

In geometry, the great cubicuboctahedron is a nonconvex uniform polyhedron, indexed as U_{14}. It has 20 faces (8 triangles, 6 squares and 6 octagrams), 48 edges, and 24 vertices. Its square faces and its octagrammic faces are parallel to those of a cube, while its triangular faces are parallel to those of an octahedron: hence the name cubicuboctahedron. The prefix great serves to distinguish it from the small cubicuboctahedron, which also has faces in the aforementioned directions.

== Orthographic projections ==
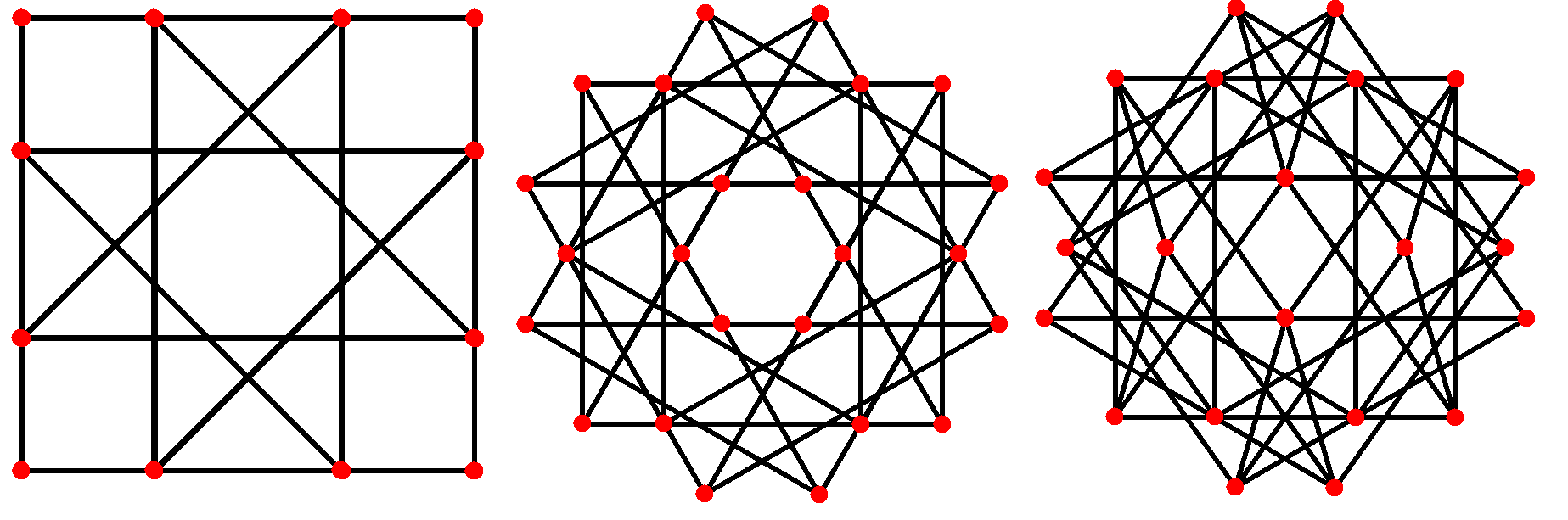

== Related polyhedra ==
It shares the vertex arrangement with the convex truncated cube and two other nonconvex uniform polyhedra. It additionally shares its edge arrangement with the nonconvex great rhombicuboctahedron (having the triangular faces and 6 square faces in common), and with the great rhombihexahedron (having the octagrammic faces in common).

Truncated cube	Nonconvex great rhombicuboctahedron	Great cubicuboctahedron	Great rhombihexahedron

=== Great hexacronic icositetrahedron ===
Great hexacronic icositetrahedron
Type	Star polyhedron
Face	
Elements	F = 24, E = 48; V = 20 (χ = −4)
Symmetry group	O_{h}, [4,3], *432
Index references	DU_{14}
dual polyhedron	Great cubicuboctahedron

3D model of a great hexacronic icositetrahedron

The great hexacronic icositetrahedron (or great lanceal disdodecahedron) is the dual of the great cubicuboctahedron.

== See also ==
- List of uniform polyhedra
