= Small cubicuboctahedron =

Small cubicuboctahedron
| Type | Uniform star polyhedron |
| Elements | F = 20, E = 48; V = 24 (χ = −4) |
| Faces by sides | 8{3}+6{4}+6{8} |
| Coxeter diagram | |
| Wythoff symbol | 3/2 4 | 4; 3 4/3 | 4 |
| Symmetry group | O_{h}, [4,3], *432 |
| Index references | U_{13}, C_{38}, W_{69} |
| Dual polyhedron | Small hexacronic icositetrahedron |
| Vertex figure | 4.8.3/2.8 |
| Bowers acronym | Socco |

3D model of a small cubicuboctahedron

In geometry, the small cubicuboctahedron is a uniform star polyhedron, indexed as U_{13}. It has 20 faces (8 triangles, 6 squares, and 6 octagons), 48 edges, and 24 vertices. Its vertex figure is a crossed quadrilateral.

The small cubicuboctahedron is a faceting of the rhombicuboctahedron. Its square faces and its octagonal faces are parallel to those of a cube, while its triangular faces are parallel to those of an octahedron: hence the name cubicuboctahedron. The small suffix serves to distinguish it from the great cubicuboctahedron, which also has faces in the aforementioned directions.

== Related polyhedra ==
It shares its vertex arrangement with the stellated truncated hexahedron. It additionally shares its edge arrangement with the rhombicuboctahedron (having the triangular faces and 6 square faces in common), and with the small rhombihexahedron (having the octagonal faces in common).

| Rhombicuboctahedron | Small cubicuboctahedron | Small rhombihexahedron | Stellated truncated hexahedron |

== Related tilings ==
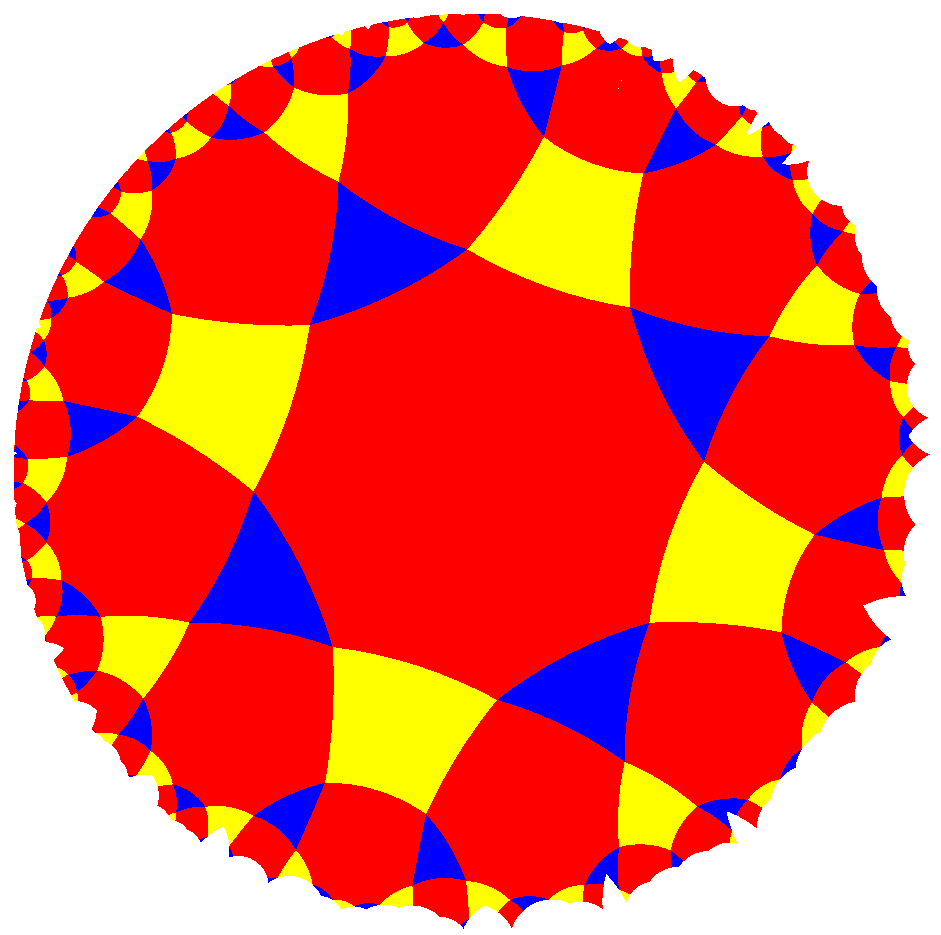
The 3 4 | 4 tiling is the tiling on the universal cover of the small cubicuboctahedron. (Yellow and red reversed in this tiling, compared to polyhedron.)

As the Euler characteristic suggests, the small cubicuboctahedron is a toroidal polyhedron of genus 3 (topologically it is a surface of genus 3), and thus can be interpreted as a (polyhedral) immersion of a genus 3 polyhedral surface, in the complement of its 24 vertices, into 3-space. (A neighborhood of any vertex is topologically a cone on a figure-8, which cannot occur in an immersion. Note that the Richter reference overlooks this fact.) The underlying polyhedron (ignoring self-intersections) defines a uniform tiling of this surface, and so the small cubicuboctahedron is a uniform polyhedron. In the language of abstract polytopes, the small cubicuboctahedron is a faithful realization of this abstract toroidal polyhedron, meaning that it is a nondegenerate polyhedron and that they have the same symmetry group. In fact, every automorphism of the abstract genus 3 surface with this tiling is realized by an isometry of Euclidean space.

Higher genus surfaces (genus 2 or greater) admit a metric of negative constant curvature (by the uniformization theorem), and the universal cover of the resulting Riemann surface is the hyperbolic plane. The corresponding tiling of the hyperbolic plane has vertex figure 3.8.4.8 (triangle, octagon, square, octagon). If the surface is given the appropriate metric of curvature = −1, the covering map is a local isometry and thus the abstract vertex figure is the same. This tiling may be denoted by the Wythoff symbol 3 4 | 4, and is depicted on the right.

The small cubicuboctahedron can also be interpreted as a polyhedral immersion (a coloring of) the Klein quartic, which is a quotient of the order-7 triangular tiling.

Alternatively and more subtly, by chopping up each square face into 2 triangles and each octagonal face into 6 triangles, the small cubicuboctahedron can be interpreted as a non-regular coloring of the combinatorially regular (not just uniform) tiling of the genus 3 surface by 56 equilateral triangles, meeting at 24 vertices, each with degree 7. This regular tiling is significant as it is a tiling of the Klein quartic, the genus 3 surface with the most symmetric metric (automorphisms of this tiling equal isometries of the surface), and the orientation-preseserving automorphism group of this surface is isomorphic to the projective special linear group PSL(2,7), equivalently GL(3,2) (the order 168 group of all orientation-preserving isometries). Note that the small cubicuboctahedron is not a realization of this abstract polyhedron, as it only has 24 orientation-preserving symmetries (not every abstract automorphism is realized by a Euclidean isometry) – the isometries of the small cubicuboctahedron preserve not only the triangular tiling, but also the coloring, and hence are a proper subgroup of the full isometry group.

The corresponding tiling of the hyperbolic plane (the universal covering) is the order-7 triangular tiling. The automorphism group of the Klein quartic can be augmented (by a symmetry which is not realized by a symmetry of the polyhedron, namely "exchanging the two endpoints of the edges that bisect the squares and octahedra) to yield the Mathieu group M_{24}.

== See also ==
- Compound of five small cubicuboctahedra
- List of uniform polyhedra
