= Deltoidal icositetrahedron =

Catalan solid with 24 kite faces

Deltoidal icositetrahedron
(rotating and 3D model)
| Type | Catalan |
| Conway notation | oC or deC |
| Coxeter diagram | |
| Face polygon | Kite with 3 equal acute angles & 1 obtuse angle |
| Faces | 24, congruent |
| Edges | 24 short + 24 long = 48 |
| Vertices | 8 (connecting 3 short edges) + 6 (connecting 4 long edges) + 12 (connecting 4 alternate short & long edges) = 26 |
| Face configuration | V3.4.4.4 |
| Symmetry group | O_{h}, BC_{3}, [4,3], *432 |
| Rotation group | O, [4,3]^{+}, (432) |
| Dihedral angle | same value for short & long edges: $\arccos \left( - \frac{7 + 4 \sqrt{2}}{17} \right)$ $\approx 138^{\circ} 07 ' 05 ''$ |
| Dual polyhedron | Rhombicuboctahedron |
| Properties | convex, face-transitive |
Net

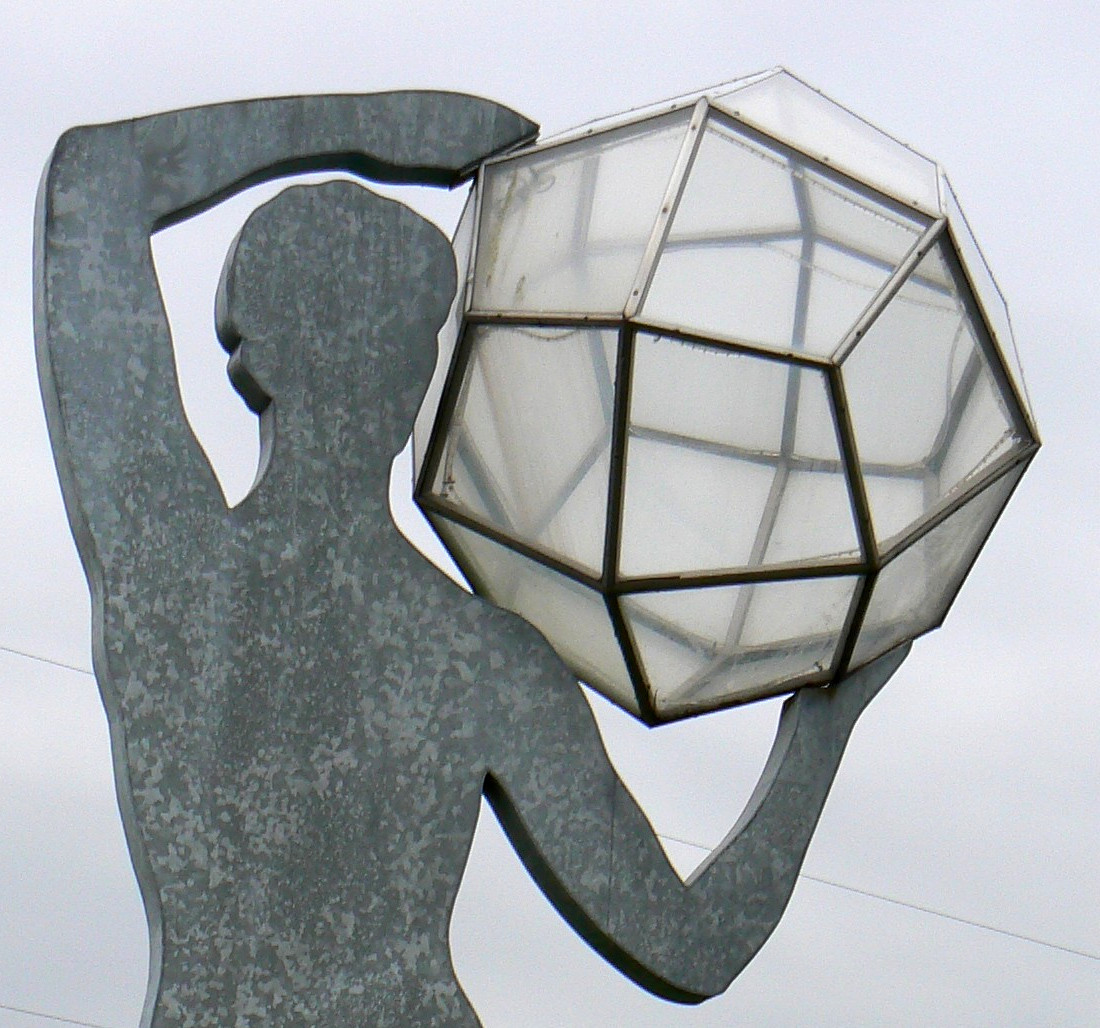
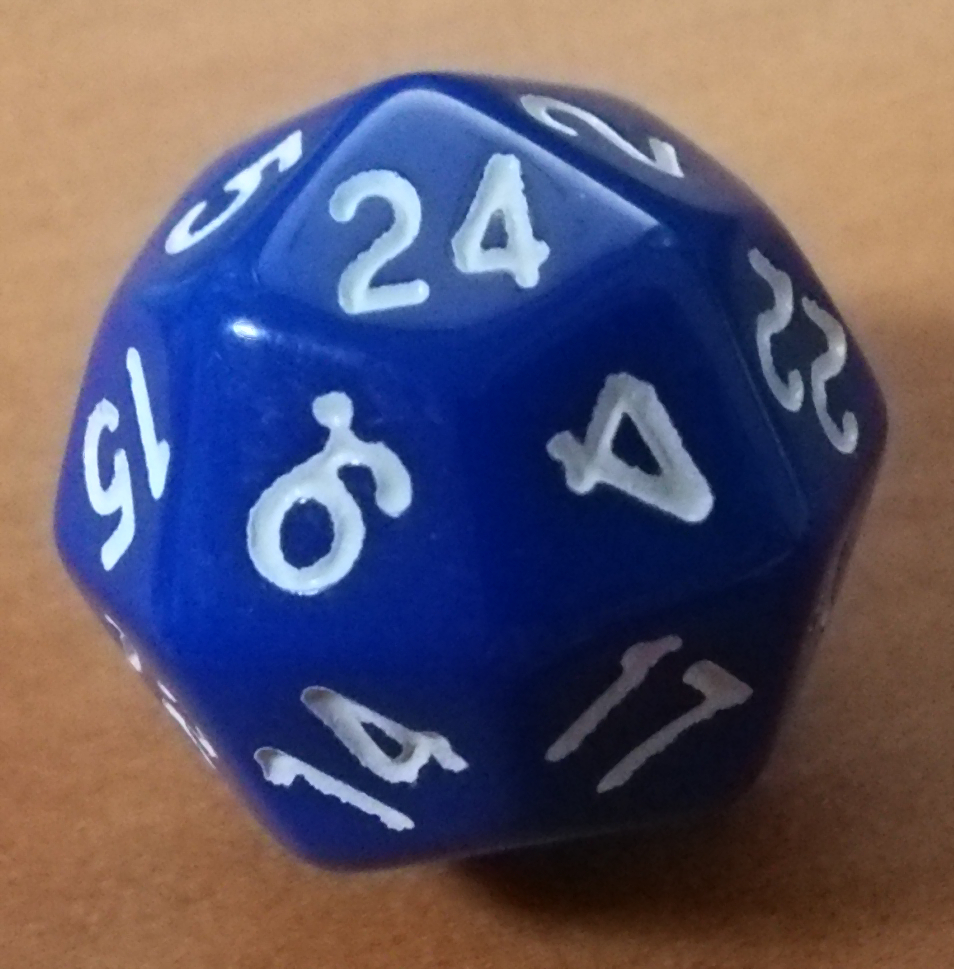
D.i. as artwork and die
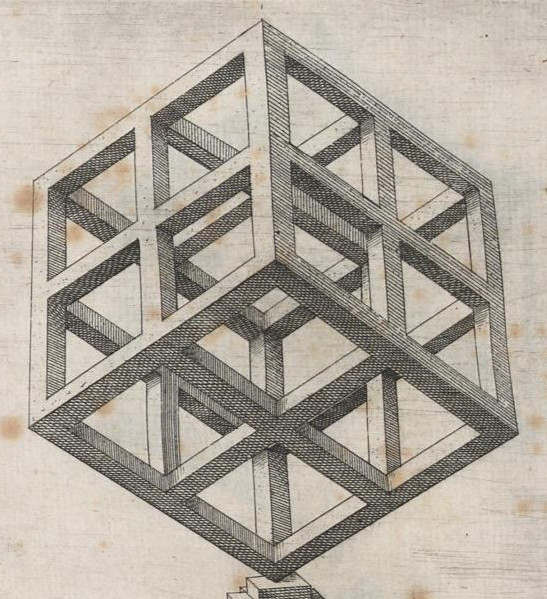
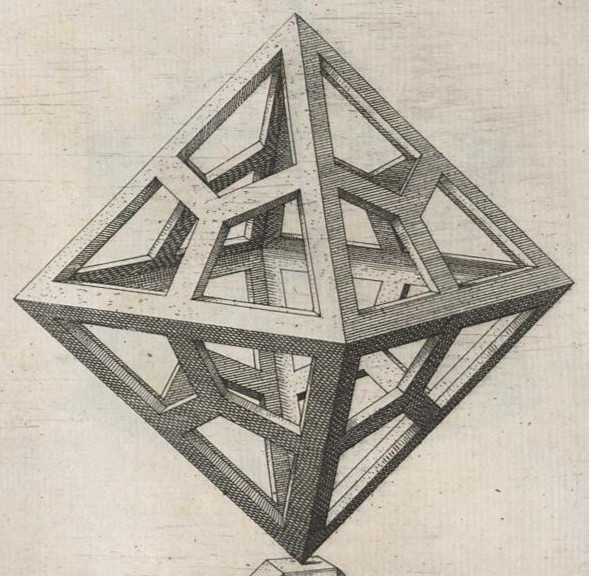
D.i. projected onto cube and octahedron in Perspectiva Corporum Regularium
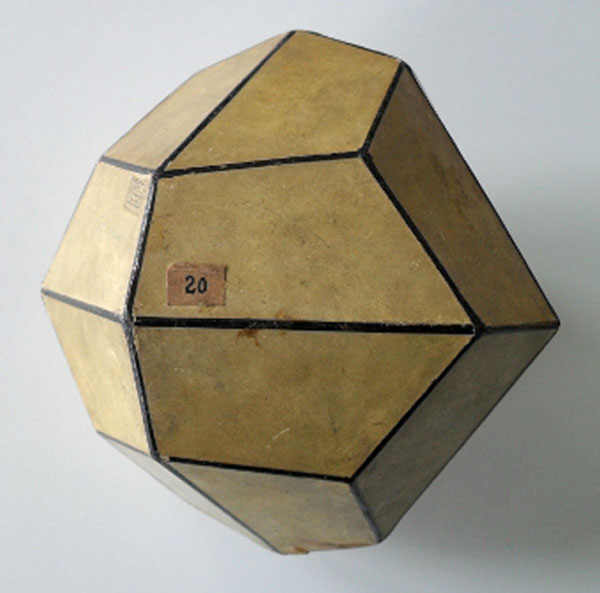
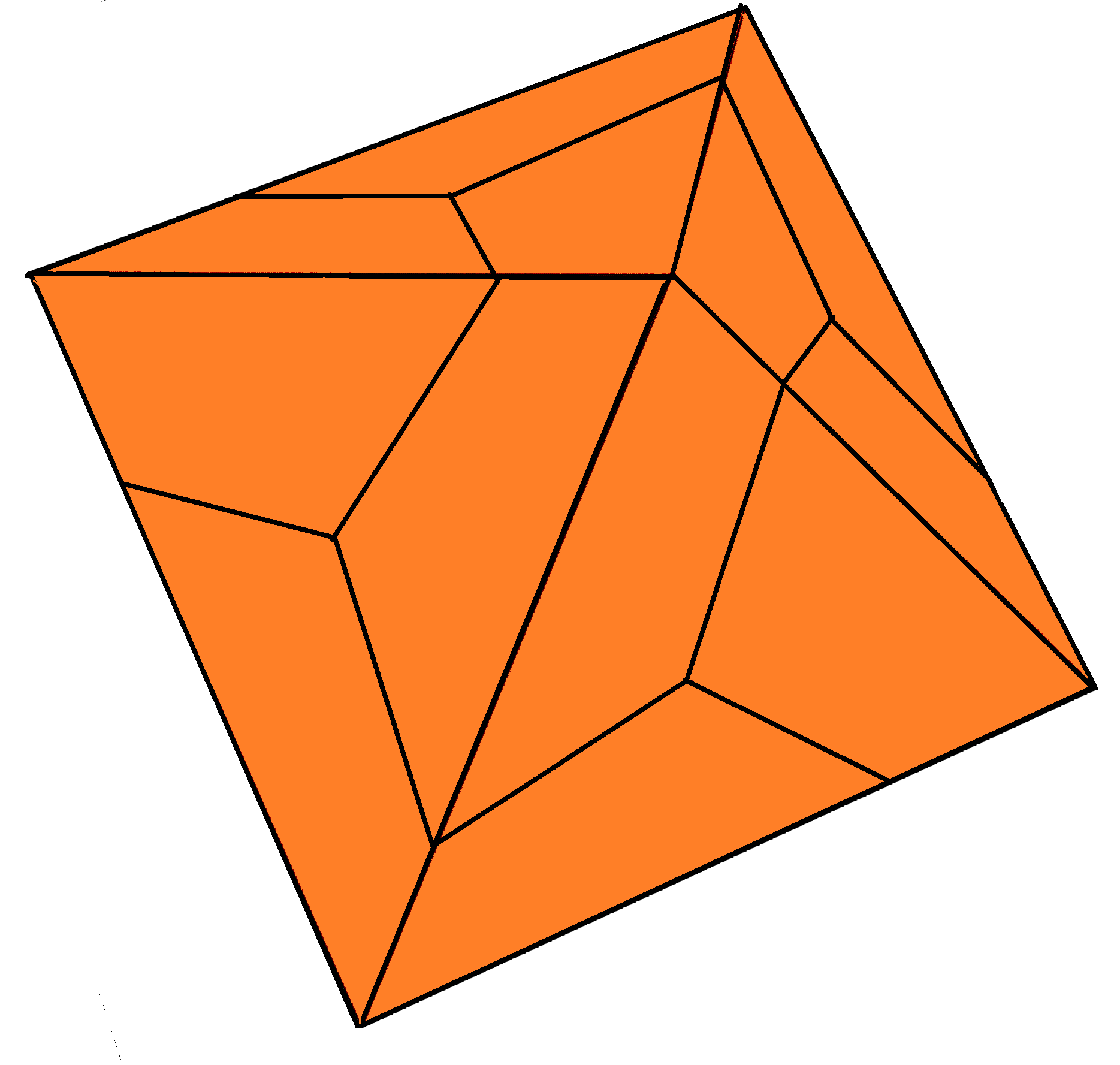
Dyakis dodecahedron crystal model and projection onto octahedron

In geometry, the deltoidal icositetrahedron (or trapezoidal icositetrahedron, tetragonal icosikaitetrahedron, tetragonal trisoctahedron, strombic icositetrahedron) is a Catalan solid.

== Description ==
3D model of a deltoidal icositetrahedron

A deltoidal icositetrahedron is a Catalan solid with 24 sides that are kites. All of its faces are congruent, each has three interior angles approximately 81.6 degrees and one angle 115.3 degrees. The dihedral angle between every two kites is 138.1 degrees. The deltoidal icositetrahedron has 48 edges, and 26 vertices – eight vertices surrounded by three kites and eighteen vertices by four kites. Its dual polyhedron is the rhombicuboctahedron, an Archimedean solid. Deltoidal icositetrahedron and deltoidal hexecontahedron are two Catalan solids with kite faces only.

== Dimensions and angles ==
=== Dimensions ===
The deltoidal icositetrahedron with long body diagonal length D = 2 has:

- short body diagonal length:

$$d = \frac{2 \sqrt{3} \left( 2 \sqrt{2} + 1 \right) }{7} \approx 1.894\,580 ;$$

- long edge length:

$$S = \sqrt{2 - \sqrt{2}} \approx 0.765\,367 ;$$

- short edge length:

$$s = \frac{ \sqrt{20 - 2 \sqrt{2}} }{7} \approx 0.591\,980 ;$$

- inradius:

$$r = \sqrt{ \frac{7 + 4 \sqrt{2}}{17} } \approx 0.862\,856 .$$

$r$ is the distance from the center to any face plane; it may be calculated by normalizing the equation of plane above, replacing (x, y, z) with (0, 0, 0), and taking the absolute value of the result.

A deltoidal icositetrahedron has its long and short edges in the ratio:

$$\frac{ S }{ s } = 2 - \frac{1}{ \sqrt{2} } \approx 1.292\,893 .$$

The deltoidal icositetrahedron with short edge length $s$ has:

- area:

$$A = 6 \sqrt{29 - 2 \sqrt{2}}\,s ^{2} ;$$

- volume:

$$V = \sqrt{122 + 71 \sqrt{2}}\,s ^{3} .$$

=== Side Lengths ===
In a deltoidal icositetrahedron, each face is a kite-shaped quadrilateral. The side lengths of these kites can be expressed in the ratio 0.7731900694928638:1. Specifically, the side adjacent to the obtuse angle has a length of approximately 0.707106785, while the side adjacent to the acute angle has a length of approximately 0.914213565.

== Occurrences in nature ==
The deltoidal icositetrahedron is a crystal habit often formed by the mineral analcime and occasionally garnet. The shape is often called a trapezohedron in mineral contexts, although in solid geometry the name trapezohedron has another meaning.

== Related polyhedra ==
The deltoidal icositetrahedron's projection onto a cube divides its squares into quadrants. The projection onto a regular octahedron divides its equilateral triangles into kite faces. In Conway polyhedron notation this represents an ortho operation to a cube or octahedron.

The deltoidal icositetrahedron (dual of the small rhombicuboctahedron) is tightly related to the disdyakis dodecahedron (dual of the great rhombicuboctahedron). The main difference is that the latter also has edges between the vertices on 3- and 4-fold symmetry axes (between yellow and red vertices in the images below).

| Deltoidal icositetrahedron | Disdyakis dodecahedron | Dyakis dodecahedron | Tetartoid |

=== Dyakis dodecahedron ===
A variant with pyritohedral symmetry is called a dyakis dodecahedron or diploid. It is common in crystallography.
A dyakis dodecahedron can be created by enlarging 24 of the 48 faces of a disdyakis dodecahedron. A tetartoid can be created by enlarging 12 of the 24 faces of a dyakis dodecahedron.

3D model of a dyakis dodecahedron

=== Stellation ===
The great triakis octahedron is a stellation of the deltoidal icositetrahedron.

== See also ==
- Tetrakis hexahedron, another 24-face Catalan solid which looks a bit like an overinflated cube.
- "The Haunter of the Dark", a story by H.P. Lovecraft, whose plot involves this figure.
