= Square cupola =

Cupola with octagonal base

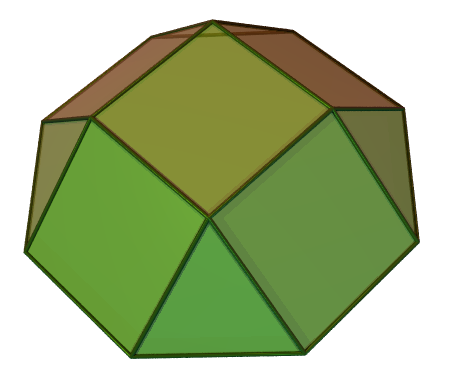
- Type: Johnson; J_{3} – J_{4} – J_{5}
- Faces: 4 triangles 5 squares 1 octagon
- Edges: 20
- Vertices: 12
- Vertex configuration: $8 \times (3 \times 4 \times 8) + 4 \times (3 \times 4^3)$
- Symmetry group: $C_{4v}$
- Properties: convex

Net

In geometry, the square cupola (sometimes called lesser dome) is a cupola with an octagonal base. In the case of all edges being equal in length, it is a Johnson solid, a convex polyhedron with regular faces. It can be used to construct many other polyhedrons, particularly other Johnson solids.

== Properties ==
The square cupola has 4 triangles, 5 squares, and 1 octagon as their faces; the octagon is the base, and one of the squares is the top. If the edges are equal in length, the triangles and octagon become regular, and the edge length of the octagon is equal to the edge length of both triangles and squares. The dihedral angle between both square and triangle is approximately $144.7^\circ$, that between both triangle and octagon is $54.7^\circ$, that between both square and octagon is precisely $45^\circ$, and that between two adjacent squares is $135^\circ$. A convex polyhedron in which all the faces are regular is a Johnson solid, and the square cupola is enumerated as $J_{4}$, the fourth Johnson solid.

Given that the edge length of $a$, the surface area of a square cupola $A$ can be calculated by adding the area of all faces:
$$A = \left(7+2\sqrt{2}+\sqrt{3}\right)a^2 \approx 11.560a^2.$$
Its height $h$, circumradius $C$, and volume $V$ are:
$$\begin{align}
h &= \frac{\sqrt{2}}{2}a \approx 0.707a, \\
C &= \left(\frac{1}{2}\sqrt{5+2\sqrt{2}}\right)a \approx 1.399a, \\
V &= \left(1+\frac{2\sqrt{2}}{3}\right)a^3 \approx 1.943a^3.
\end{align}$$

3D model of a square cupola

It has an axis of symmetry passing through the center of its both top and base, which is symmetrical by rotating around it at one-, two-, and three-quarters of a full-turn angle. It is also mirror-symmetric relative to any perpendicular plane passing through a bisector of the base. Therefore, it has pyramidal symmetry, the cyclic group $C_{4v}$ of order 8.

== Related polyhedra and honeycombs ==
The square cupola can be found in many constructions of polyhedra. An example is the rhombicuboctahedron, which can be seen as eight overlapping cupolae. A construction that involves the attachment of its base to another polyhedron is known as augmentation; attaching it to prisms or antiprisms is known as elongation or gyroelongation. Some of the other Johnson solids are elongated square cupola $J_{19}$, gyroelongated square cupola $J_{23}$, square orthobicupola $J_{28}$, square gyrobicupola $J_{29}$, elongated square gyrobicupola $J_{37}$, gyroelongated square bicupola $J_{45}$, augmented truncated cube $J_{66}$, and biaugmented truncated cube $J_{67}$.

3D model of a crossed square cupola

The crossed square cupola is one of the nonconvex Johnson solid isomorphs, being topologically identical to the convex square cupola. It can be obtained as a slice of the nonconvex great rhombicuboctahedron or quasirhombicuboctahedron, analogously to how the square cupola may be obtained as a slice of the rhombicuboctahedron. As in all cupolae, the base polygon has twice as many edges and vertices as the top; in this case the base polygon is an octagram. It may be seen as a cupola with a retrograde square base, so that the squares and triangles connect across the bases in the opposite way to the square cupola, hence intersecting each other.

The square cupola is a component of several nonuniform space-filling lattices:

- with tetrahedra;
- with cubes and cuboctahedra; and
- with tetrahedra, square pyramids and various combinations of cubes, elongated square pyramids and elongated square bipyramids.
