= Augmented truncated cube =

66th Johnson solid (22 faces)

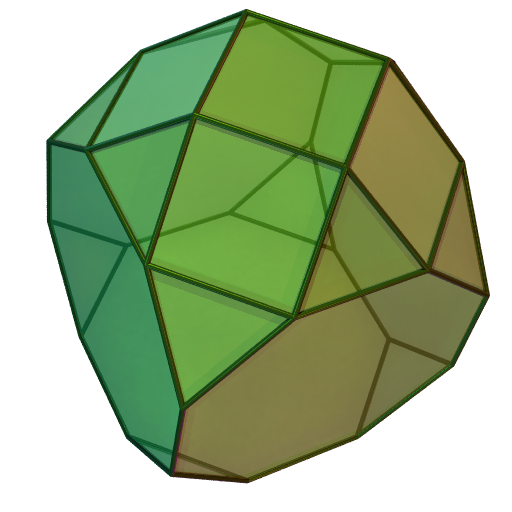
- Type: Johnson; J_{65} – J_{66} – J_{67}
- Faces: 3×4 triangles 1+4 squares 1+4 octagons
- Edges: 48
- Vertices: 28
- Vertex configuration: 2.4+8(3.8^{2}); 4(3.4^{3}); 8(3.4.3.8)
- Symmetry group: C_{4v}
- Dual polyhedron: -
- Properties: convex

Net
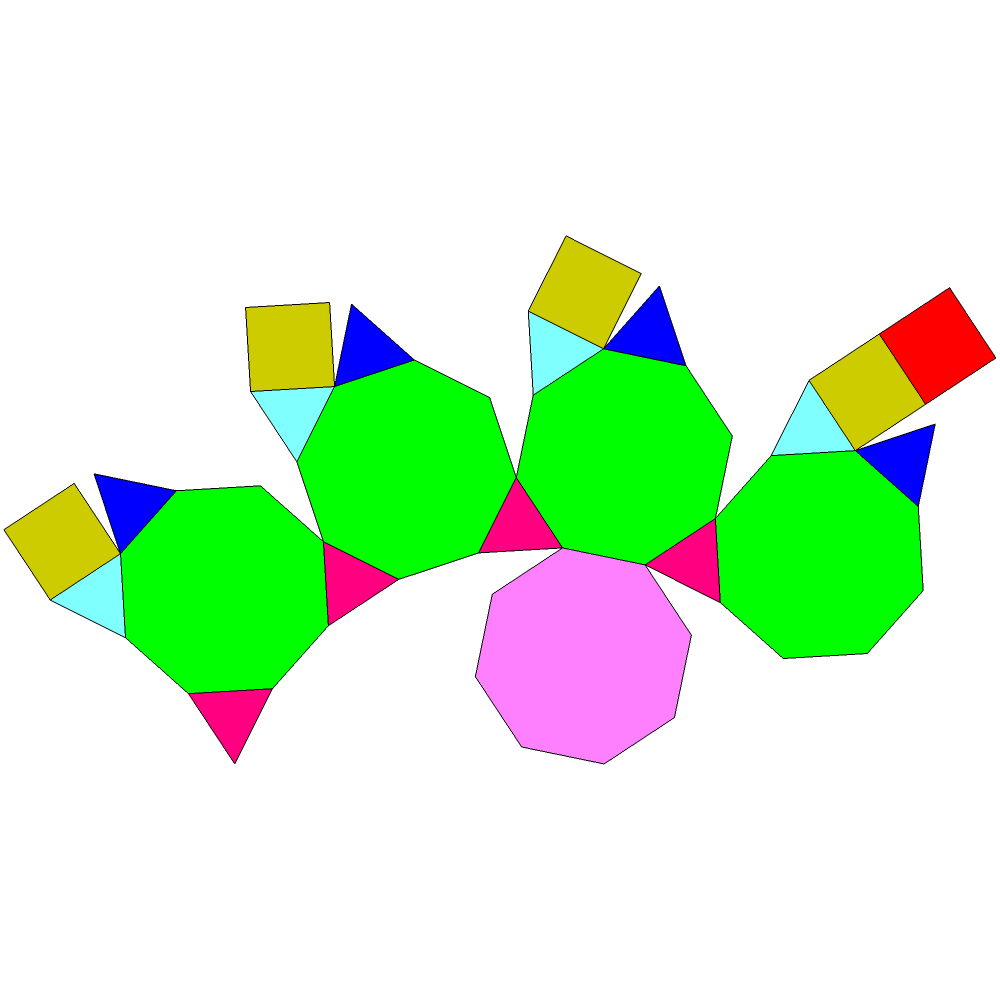

In geometry, the augmented truncated cube is one of the Johnson solids (J_{66}). As its name suggests, it is created by attaching a square cupola (J_{4}) onto one octagonal face of a truncated cube.

A Johnson solid is one of 92 strictly convex polyhedra that are composed of regular polygon faces but are not uniform polyhedra (that is, they are not Platonic solids, Archimedean solids, prisms, or antiprisms). They were named by Norman Johnson, who first listed these polyhedra in 1966.

3D model of an augmented truncated cube
