= Biaugmented truncated cube =

67th Johnson solid (30 faces)

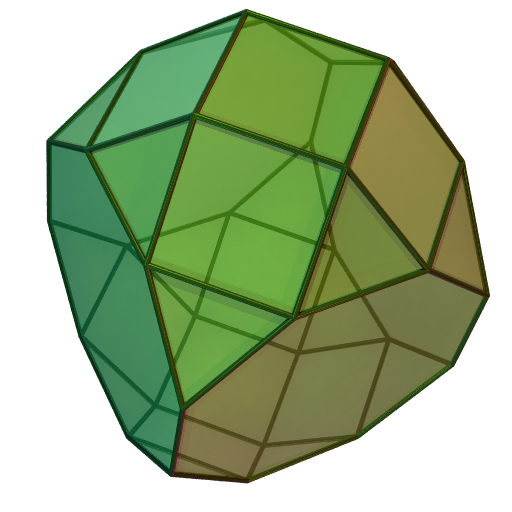
- Type: Johnson; J_{66} – J_{67} – J_{68}
- Faces: 2×8 triangles 2+8 squares 4 octagons
- Edges: 60
- Vertices: 32
- Vertex configuration: 8(3.8^{2}); 8(3.4^{3}); 16(3.4.3.8)
- Symmetry group: D_{4h}
- Dual polyhedron: -
- Properties: convex

Net
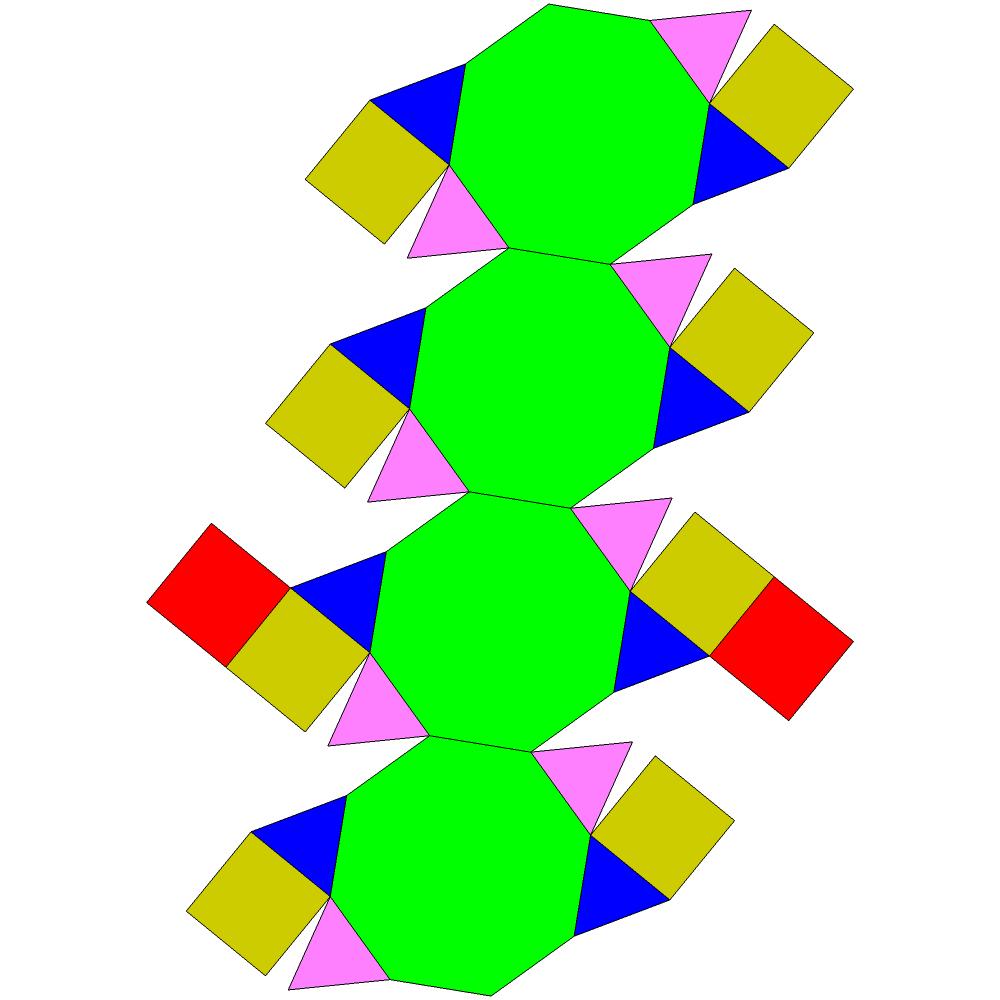

In geometry, the biaugmented truncated cube is one of the Johnson solids (J_{67}). As its name suggests, it is created by attaching two square cupolas (J_{4}) onto two parallel octagonal faces of a truncated cube.

== Construction ==
Similar to the augmented truncated cube, the biaugmented truncated cube is constructed by attaching two square cupolae onto the opposite pair of faces of a truncated cube; this makes it a composite polyhedron. Covering and replacing two octagons with cupola faces (ten squares and four equilateral triangles in total), the biaugmented truncated cube has sixteen equilateral triangles, ten squares, and four regular octagons as its faces. In total, it has thirty faces, sixty edges, and thirty-two vertices.

A convex polyhedron with regular polygonal faces is a Johnson solid, after American mathematician Norman W. Johnson who list 92 such polyhedra, excluding uniform polyhedra (i.e., Platonic solids, Archimedean solids, and the infinitely many families of prisms and antiprisms). The biaugmented truncated cube is enumerated as the sixty-seventh Johnson solid $J_{67}$.

== Properties ==
3D model of a biaugmented truncated cube

The biaugmented truncated cube has dihedral angles (angles between two polygonal faces), obtained from the angles of a square cupola and a truncated cube, as follows.

- An angle between two adjacent octagonal faces is the same angle as in the truncated cube, the internal angle of a square, 90°.
- An angle between two adjacent square faces is the same angle as in the square cupola, 135°.
- A triangle-to-octagon angle is the same angle as in the truncated cube, around 125.3°.
- A triangle-to-square angle is the same angle as in the square cupola, 144.7°.
- A triangle-to-octagon angle, where a square cupola is attached to a truncated cube, is around 147.4°. This is obtained by adding the 90° of the octagon-octagon angle from truncated cube to the ≈57.4° of the octagon-triangle angle from the square cupola.
- A triangle-to-square angle, where a square cupola is attached to a truncated cube, is around 170.3°. This is obtained by adding the ≈125.3° of the triangle-octagon angle from the truncated cube to the 45° of the square-octagon angle from the square cupola.
