= Great rhombihexacron =

Polyhedron with 24 faces

Great rhombihexacron
Type	Star polyhedron
Face	
Elements	F = 24, E = 48; V = 18 (χ = −6)
Symmetry group	O_{h}, [4,3], *432
Index references	DU_{21}
dual polyhedron	Great rhombihexahedron

In geometry, the great rhombihexacron (or great dipteral disdodecahedron) is a nonconvex isohedral polyhedron. It is the dual of the uniform great rhombihexahedron (U_{21}). It has 24 identical bow-tie-shaped faces, 18 vertices, and 48 edges.

It has 12 outer vertices which have the same vertex arrangement as the cuboctahedron, and 6 inner vertices with the vertex arrangement of an octahedron.

As a surface geometry, it can be seen as visually similar to a Catalan solid, the disdyakis dodecahedron, with much taller rhombus-based pyramids joined to each face of a rhombic dodecahedron.

== Proportions ==
Each bow-tie has two angles of $\arccos(\frac{1}{2}+\frac{1}{4}\sqrt{2})\approx 31.399\,714\,809\,92^{\circ}$ and two angles of $\arccos(-\frac{1}{4}+\frac{1}{2}\sqrt{2})\approx 62.799\,429\,619\,84^{\circ}$. The diagonals of each bow-tie intersect at an angle of $\arccos(\frac{1}{4}-\frac{1}{8}\sqrt{2})\approx 85.800\,855\,570\,24^{\circ}$. The dihedral angle equals $\arccos(\frac{-7+4\sqrt{2}}{17})\approx 94.531\,580\,798\,20^{\circ}$. The ratio between the lengths of the long edges and the short ones equals $\sqrt{2}$.
