= Small rhombihexacron =

Polyhedron with 24 faces

Small rhombihexacron
Type	Star polyhedron
Face	
Elements	F = 24, E = 48; V = 18 (χ = −6)
Symmetry group	O_{h}, [4,3], *432
Index references	DU_{18}
dual polyhedron	Small rhombihexahedron

3D model of a small rhombihexacron

In geometry, the small rhombihexacron (or small dipteral disdodecahedron) is the dual of the small rhombihexahedron. It is visually identical to the small hexacronic icositetrahedron. Its faces are antiparallelograms formed by pairs of coplanar triangles.

== Proportions ==
Each antiparallelogram has two angles of $\arccos(\frac{1}{4}+\frac{1}{2}\sqrt{2})\approx 16.842\,116\,236\,30^{\circ}$ and two angles of $\arccos(-\frac{1}{2}+\frac{1}{4}\sqrt{2})\approx 98.421\,058\,118\,15^{\circ}$. The diagonals of each antiparallelogram intersect at an angle of $\arccos(\frac{1}{4}+\frac{1}{8}\sqrt{2})\approx 64.736\,825\,645\,55^{\circ}$. The dihedral angle equals $\arccos(\frac{-7-4\sqrt{2}}{17})\approx 138.117\,959\,055\,51^{\circ}$. The ratio between the lengths of the long edges and the short ones equals $\sqrt{2}$.
