= Great deltoidal icositetrahedron =

Polyhedron with 24 faces

Great deltoidal icositetrahedron
Type	Star polyhedron
Face	
Elements	F = 24, E = 48; V = 26 (χ = 2)
Symmetry group	O_{h}, [4,3], *432
Index references	DU_{17}
dual polyhedron	Nonconvex great rhombicuboctahedron

In geometry, the great deltoidal icositetrahedron (or great sagittal disdodecahedron) is the dual of the nonconvex great rhombicuboctahedron. Its faces are darts. Part of each dart lies inside the solid, hence is invisible in solid models.

One of its halves can be rotated by 45 degrees to form the pseudo great deltoidal icositetrahedron, analogous to the pseudo-deltoidal icositetrahedron.

== Proportions ==
Faces have three angles of $\arccos(\frac{1}{2}+\frac{1}{4}\sqrt{2})\approx 31.399\,714\,809\,92^{\circ}$ and one of $360^{\circ}-\arccos(-\frac{1}{4}+\frac{1}{8}\sqrt{2})\approx 265.800\,855\,570\,24^{\circ}$. Its dihedral angles equal $\arccos({\frac{-7+4\sqrt{2}}{17}})\approx 94.531\,580\,798\,20^{\circ}$. The ratio between the lengths of the long edges and the short ones equals $2+\frac{1}{2}\sqrt{2}\approx 2.707\,106\,781\,19$.
