= Elongated square gyrobicupola =

Polyhedron with 8 triangular and 18 square faces

- Type: Canonical, Johnson; J_{36} – J_{37} – J_{38}
- Faces: 8 triangles 18 squares
- Edges: 48
- Vertices: 24
- Vertex configuration: $24 (3 \cdot 4^3)$
- Symmetry group: $D_{4\mathrm{d}}$
- Dihedral angle (degrees): square-to-square: 135° square-to-triangle: 144.7°
- Properties: convex, singular vertex figure

Net
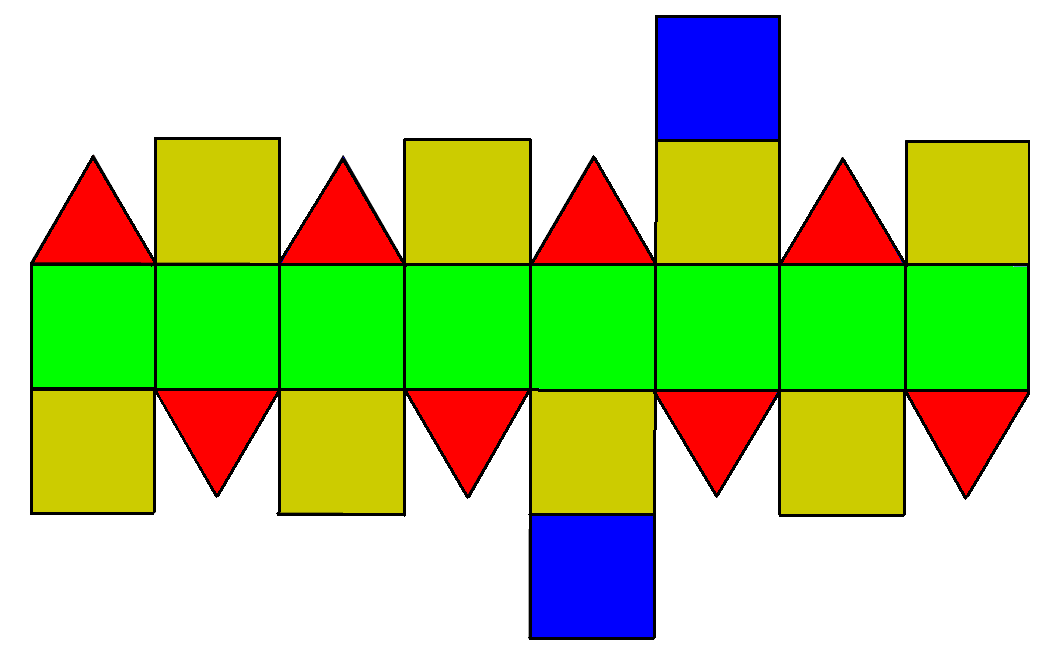

In geometry, the elongated square gyrobicupola is a polyhedron constructed by two square cupolas attaching onto the bases of octagonal prism, with one of them rotated. It is a canonical polyhedron. It is not considered to be an Archimedean solid because it lacks a set of global symmetries that map every vertex to every other vertex, unlike the 13 Archimedean solids. However, it was once mistakenly considered a rhombicuboctahedron by many mathematicians.

== Connection to the rhombicuboctahedron ==
=== Construction and origin ===
The elongated square gyrobicupola can be constructed similarly to the rhombicuboctahedron. Take two regular-faced square cupolas and glue them onto the octagonal prism's bases (this process is called elongation). One of its cupolae is twisted by 45°, hence the prefix "gyro" from the abbreviation of gyration, making the triangular faces staggered vertically. Having same components, where both cupolae replace the octagons, both polyhedra have eight equilateral triangles and eighteen squares. Together, they are composite polyhedra, slicable by a plane to produce smaller, convex, regular-faced polyhedra: the cupolae and a regular-faced octagonal prism.

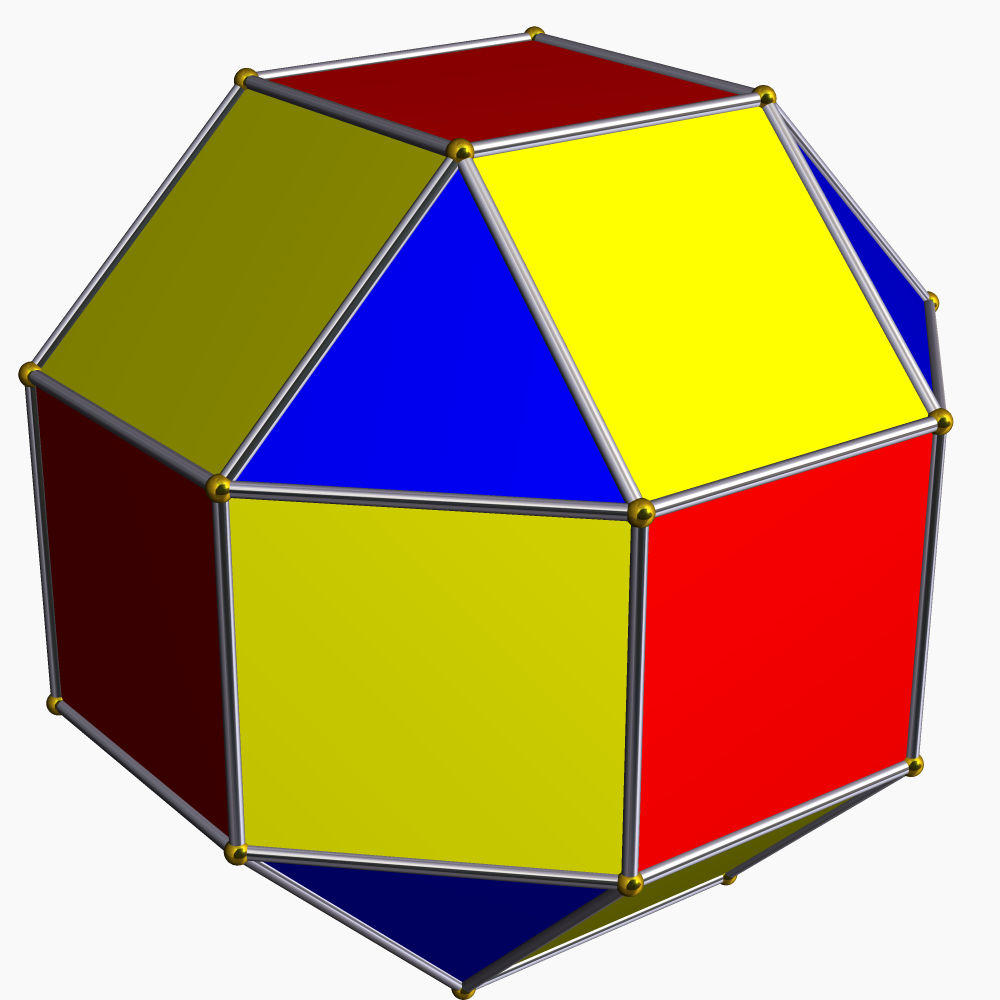
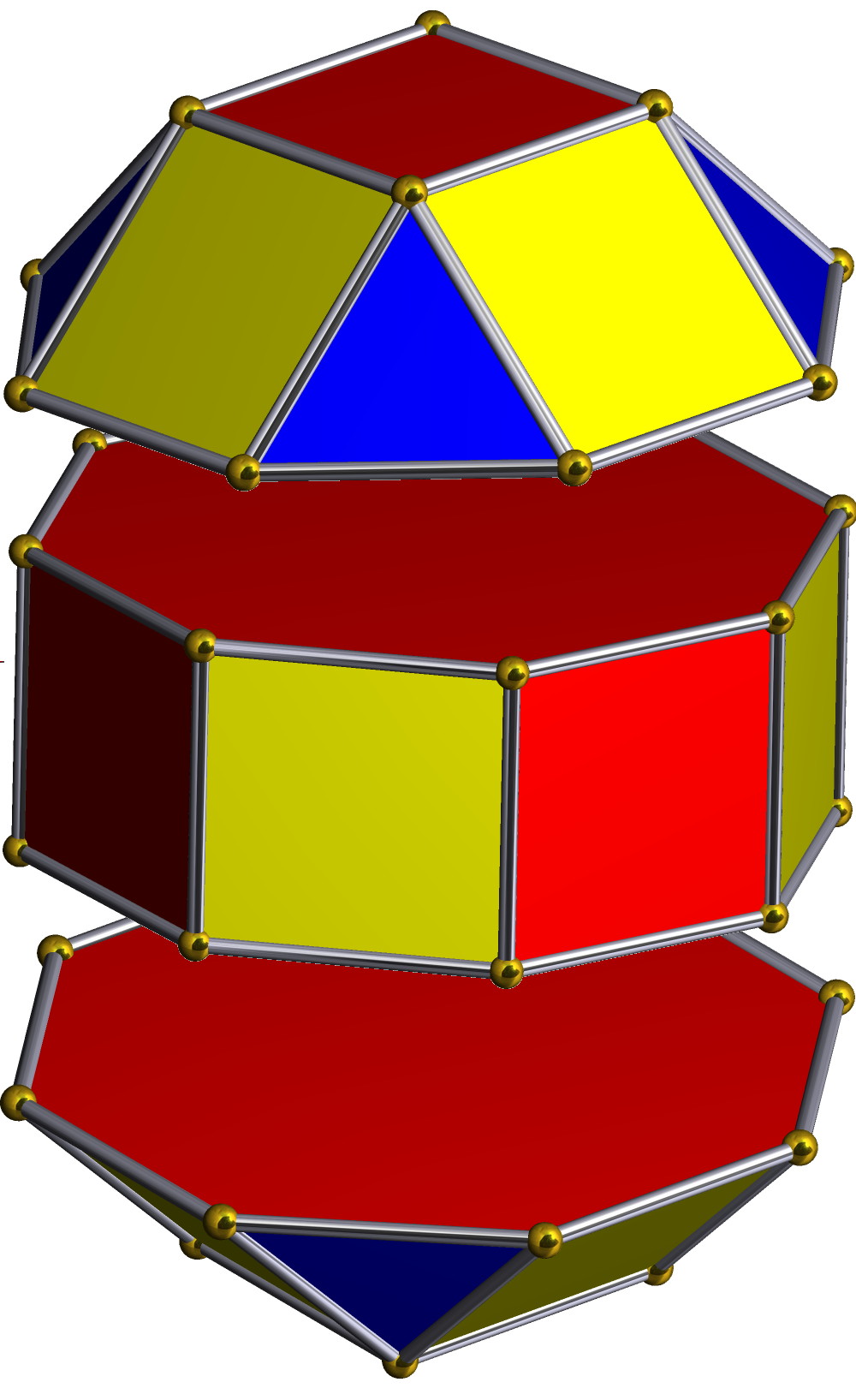
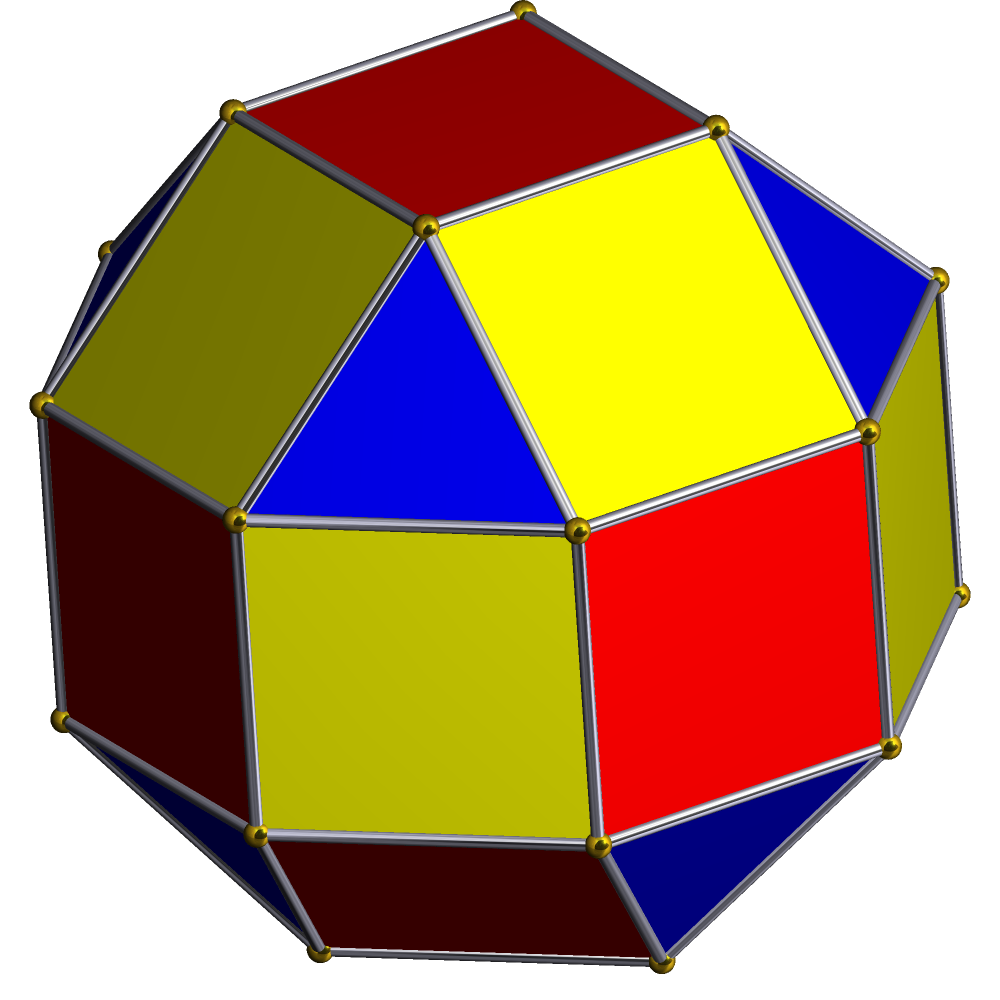
Process of the construction of the elongated square gyrobicupola, starting from a rhombicuboctahedron

The elongated square gyrobicupola may have been discovered by Johannes Kepler in his enumeration of the Archimedean solids, but its first clear appearance in print appears to be the work of Duncan Sommerville in 1905. It was independently rediscovered by J. C. P. Miller in 1930 by mistake while attempting to construct a model of the rhombicuboctahedron. This solid was discovered again by V. G. Ashkinuse in 1957. For this reason, some alternative names are pseudo-rhombicuboctahedron, Miller solid, or Miller–Askinuze solid.

=== Measurement ===
The elongated square gyrobicupola and rhombicuboctahedron have the same components, they have the same surface area and volume. For any edge length $a$, their surface area is the sum of the areas of eight equilateral triangles and eighteen squares:
$$\left(18+2\sqrt{3}\right)a^2 \approx 21.464a^2,$$
Their volume can be calculated by slicing into two square cupolae and one octagonal prism:
$$\frac{12+10\sqrt{2}}{3}a^3 \approx 8.714a^3.$$

The dihedral angles of the elongated square gyrobicupola can be found in a similar way as the rhombicuboctahedron, by adding the dihedral angles of a square cupola and an octagonal prism:

- The dihedral angle of a rhombicuboctahedron between two adjacent squares on both the top and bottom is that of a square cupola, 135°. The dihedral angle of an octagonal prism between two adjacent squares is the internal angle of a regular octagon, 135°. The dihedral angle between two adjacent squares on the edge where a square cupola is attached to an octagonal prism is the sum of the dihedral angle of a square cupola square-to-octagon and the dihedral angle of an octagonal prism square-to-octagon, 45° + 90° = 135°. Therefore, the dihedral angle of a rhombicuboctahedron for every two adjacent squares is 135°.
- The dihedral angle of a rhombicuboctahedron square-to-triangle is that of a square cupola between those, ≈144.7°. The dihedral angle between square-to-triangle, on the edge where a square cupola is attached to an octagonal prism, is the sum of the dihedral angle of a square cupola triangle-to-octagon and the dihedral angle of an octagonal prism square-to-octagon, ≈ 54.7° + 90° = 144.7°. Therefore, the dihedral angle of a rhombicuboctahedron for every square-to-triangle is ≈144.7°.

=== Symmetry and classifications ===
3D model of an elongated square gyrobicupola

The elongated square gyrobicupola was once believed to be one of the Archimedean solids, a highly symmetrical and vertex-transitive class of polyhedra, having a single vertex configuration. The elongated square gyrobicupola and the rhombicuboctahedron have the same single vertex configuration, $3.4.4.4$, where each vertex is surrounded by a triangle and three equilateral triangles. Nevertheless, the elongated square gyrobicupola's three-dimensional symmetry group is $D_{4\mathrm{v}}$ of order 16. That being said, it is locally vertex-regular: the arrangement of the four faces incident on any vertex is the same for all vertices, and the manner wherein it is "twisted" gives it a distinct "equator" and two distinct "poles", which in turn divide its vertices into eight polar vertices (four per pole) and sixteen equatorial vertices. Thus, it is not vertex-transitive. Now, the elongated square gyrobicupola is categorized instead as a Johnson solid, named after American mathematician Norman W. Johnson, who enumerated the 92 nonuniform convex polyhedra with regular polygonals faces, enumerated as the 37th Johnson solid $J_{37}$.

== Other polyhedra and honeycombs ==
The dual of an elongated square gyrobicupola

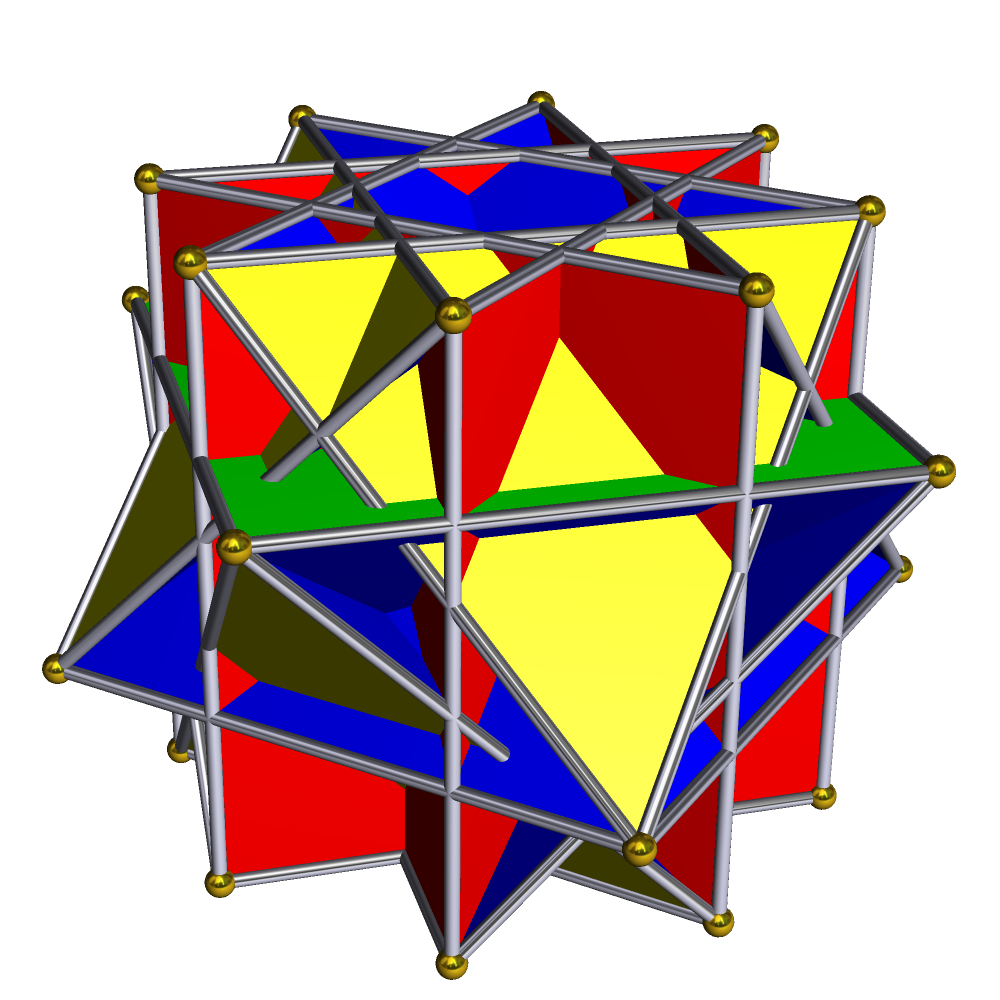
The pseudo great rhombicuboctahedron

The dual polyhedron of the elongated square gyrobicupola is the gyrate deltoidal icositetrahedron, which has twenty-six vertices, twenty-four kite faces, and forty-eight edges. It has two different edge lengths, with ratio $4-\sqrt{2}:2$. It has the same symmetry as the elongated square gyrobicupola, $D_{4v}$ of order 16.

The pseudo great rhombicuboctahedron is a nonconvex analog of the pseudo-rhombicuboctahedron, constructed in a similar way from the nonconvex great rhombicuboctahedron.

The elongated square gyrobicupola can form a space-filling honeycomb with the regular tetrahedron, cube, and cuboctahedron. It can also form another honeycomb with the tetrahedron, square pyramid, and various combinations of cubes, elongated square pyramids, and elongated square bipyramids.

== In chemistry ==
The polyvanadate ion [V_{18}O_{42}]^{12−} has a pseudo-rhombicuboctahedral structure, where each square face acts as the base of a VO_{5} pyramid.
