= Great hexacronic icositetrahedron =

Polyhedron with 24 faces

Great hexacronic icositetrahedron
Type	Star polyhedron
Face	
Elements	F = 24, E = 48; V = 20 (χ = −4)
Symmetry group	O_{h}, [4,3], *432
Index references	DU_{14}
dual polyhedron	Great cubicuboctahedron

In geometry, the great hexacronic icositetrahedron is the dual of the great cubicuboctahedron. Its faces are kites. Part of each kite lies inside the solid, hence is invisible in solid models.

== Proportions ==
The kites have two angles of $\arccos(\frac{1}{4}-\frac{1}{2}\sqrt{2})\approx 117.200\,570\,380\,16^{\circ}$, one of $\arccos(-\frac{1}{4}+\frac{1}{8}\sqrt{2})\approx 94.199\,144\,429\,76^{\circ}$ and one of $\arccos(\frac{1}{2}+\frac{1}{4}\sqrt{2})\approx 31.399\,714\,809\,92^{\circ}$. The dihedral angle equals $\arccos(\frac{-7+4\sqrt{2}}{17})\approx 94.531\,580\,798\,20^{\circ}$. The ratio between the lengths of the long and short edges is $2+\frac{1}{2}\sqrt{2}\approx 2.70710678118655$.
