= Small rhombihexahedron =

Polyhedron with 18 faces

Small rhombihexahedron
Type	Uniform star polyhedron
Elements	F = 18, E = 48; V = 24 (χ = −6)
Faces by sides	12{4}+6{8}
Coxeter diagram	(with extra double-covered triangles) (with extra double-covered squares)
Wythoff symbol	2 4 (3/2 4/2) |
Symmetry group	O_{h}, [4,3], *432
Index references	U_{18}, C_{60}, W_{86}
Dual polyhedron	Small rhombihexacron
Vertex figure	4.8.4/3.8/7
Bowers acronym	Sroh

3D model of a small rhombihexahedron

In geometry, the small rhombihexahedron (or small rhombicube) is a nonconvex uniform polyhedron, indexed as U_{18}. It has 18 faces (12 squares and 6 octagons), 48 edges, and 24 vertices. Its vertex figure is an antiparallelogram.

== Related polyhedra ==
This polyhedron shares the vertex arrangement with the stellated truncated hexahedron. It additionally shares its edge arrangement with the convex rhombicuboctahedron (having 12 square faces in common) and with the small cubicuboctahedron (having the octagonal faces in common).

Rhombicuboctahedron	Small cubicuboctahedron	Small rhombihexahedron	Stellated truncated hexahedron

It may be constructed as the exclusive or (blend) of three octagonal prisms.
