= Small hexacronic icositetrahedron =

Polyhedron with 24 faces

Small hexacronic icositetrahedron
Type	Star polyhedron
Face	
Elements	F = 24, E = 48; V = 20 (χ = −4)
Symmetry group	O_{h}, [4,3], *432
Index references	DU_{13}
dual polyhedron	Small cubicuboctahedron

3D model of a small hexacronic icositetrahedron

In geometry, the small hexacronic icositetrahedron is the dual of the small cubicuboctahedron. It is visually identical to the small rhombihexacron. A part of each dart lies inside the solid, hence is invisible in solid models.

== Proportions ==
Its faces are darts, having two angles of $\arccos(\frac{1}{4}+\frac{1}{2}\sqrt{2})\approx 16.842\,116\,236\,30^{\circ}$, one of $\arccos(\frac{1}{2}-\frac{1}{4}\sqrt{2})\approx 81.578\,941\,881\,85^{\circ}$ and one of $360^{\circ}-\arccos(-\frac{1}{4}-\frac{1}{8}\sqrt{2})\approx 244.736\,825\,645\,55^{\circ}$. Its dihedral angles equal $\arccos({\frac{-7-4\sqrt{2}}{17}})\approx 138.117\,959\,055\,51^{\circ}$. The ratio between the lengths of the long edges and the short ones equals $2-\frac{1}{2}\sqrt{2}\approx 1.292\,893\,218\,81$.
