= Great triakis octahedron =

Polyhedron with 24 faces

Great triakis octahedron
Type	Star polyhedron
Face	
Elements	F = 24, E = 36; V = 14 (χ = 2)
Symmetry group	O_{h}, [4,3], *432
Index references	DU_{19}
dual polyhedron	Stellated truncated hexahedron

3D model of a great triakis octahedron

In geometry, the great triakis octahedron is the dual of the stellated truncated hexahedron (U_{19}). It has 24 intersecting isosceles triangle faces. Part of each triangle lies within the solid, hence is invisible in solid models.

== Proportions ==
The triangles have one angle of $\arccos(\frac{1}{4}+\frac{1}{2}\sqrt{2})\approx 16.842\,116\,236\,30^{\circ}$ and two of $\arccos(\frac{1}{2}-\frac{1}{4}\sqrt{2})\approx 81.578\,941\,881\,85^{\circ}$. The dihedral angle equals $\arccos(\frac{-3+8\sqrt{2}}{17})\approx 60.722\,386\,809\,64^{\circ}$.
