= Nonconvex great rhombicuboctahedron =

Nonconvex uniform polyhedron with 26 faces

Nonconvex great rhombicuboctahedron
Type	Uniform star polyhedron
Elements	F = 26, E = 48; V = 24 (χ = 2)
Faces by sides	8{3}+(6+12){4}
Coxeter diagram	
Wythoff symbol	3/2 4 | 2; 3 4/3 | 2
Symmetry group	O_{h}, [4,3], *432
Index references	U_{17}, C_{59}, W_{85}
Dual polyhedron	Great deltoidal icositetrahedron
Vertex figure	4.4.4.3/2
Bowers acronym	Querco

3D model of a nonconvex great rhombicuboctahedron

In geometry, the nonconvex great rhombicuboctahedron is a nonconvex uniform polyhedron, indexed as U_{17}. It has 26 faces (8 triangles and 18 squares), 48 edges, and 24 vertices. It is represented by the Schläfli symbol rr{4,3/2} and Coxeter-Dynkin diagram of. Its vertex figure is a crossed quadrilateral.

This model shares the name with the convex great rhombicuboctahedron, also called the truncated cuboctahedron.

An alternative name for this figure is quasirhombicuboctahedron. From that derives its Bowers acronym: querco.

== Orthographic projections ==
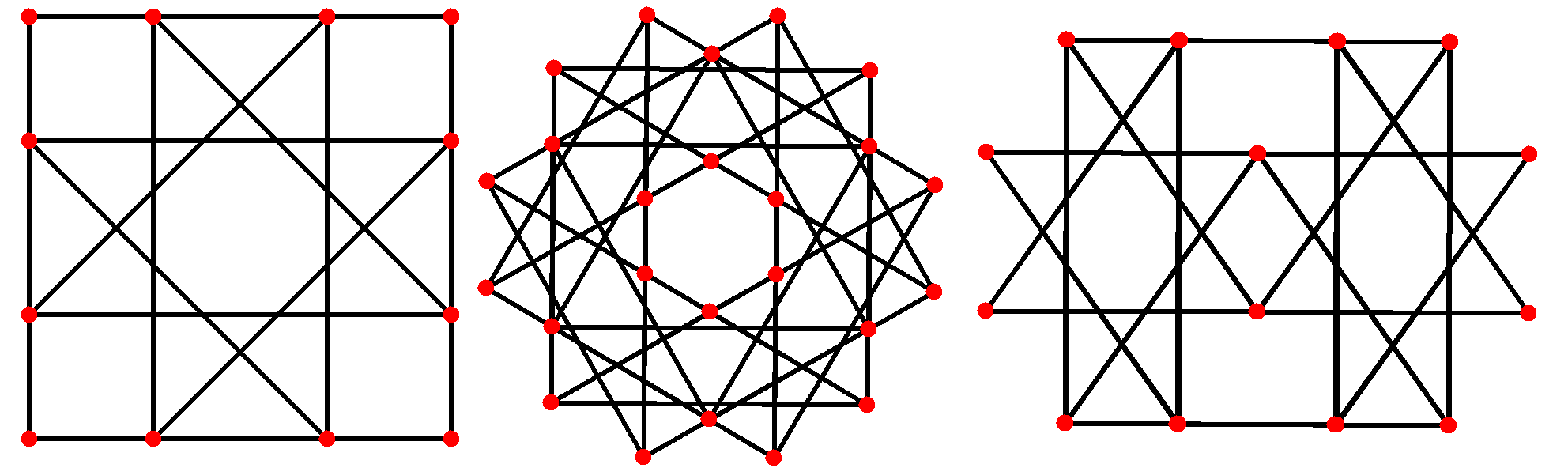

== Cartesian coordinates ==
Cartesian coordinates for the vertices of a nonconvex great rhombicuboctahedron centered at the origin with edge length 1 are all the permutations of

$\Bigl(\pm \left[\sqrt 2 - 1\right],\ \pm 1,\ \pm 1\Bigr).$

== Related polyhedra ==
It shares the vertex arrangement with the convex truncated cube. It additionally shares its edge arrangement with the great cubicuboctahedron (having the triangular faces and 6 square faces in common), and with the great rhombihexahedron (having 12 square faces in common). It has the same vertex figure as the pseudo great rhombicuboctahedron, which is not a uniform polyhedron.

Truncated cube	Great rhombicuboctahedron	Great cubicuboctahedron	Great rhombihexahedron	Pseudo great rhombicuboctahedron

=== Great deltoidal icositetrahedron ===
Great deltoidal icositetrahedron
Type	Star polyhedron
Face	
Elements	F = 24, E = 48; V = 26 (χ = 2)
Symmetry group	O_{h}, [4,3], *432
Index references	DU_{17}
dual polyhedron	Nonconvex great rhombicuboctahedron

3D model of a great deltoidal icositetrahedron

The great deltoidal icositetrahedron is the dual of the nonconvex great rhombicuboctahedron.
