= Rhombicuboctahedron =

Archimedean solid with 26 faces

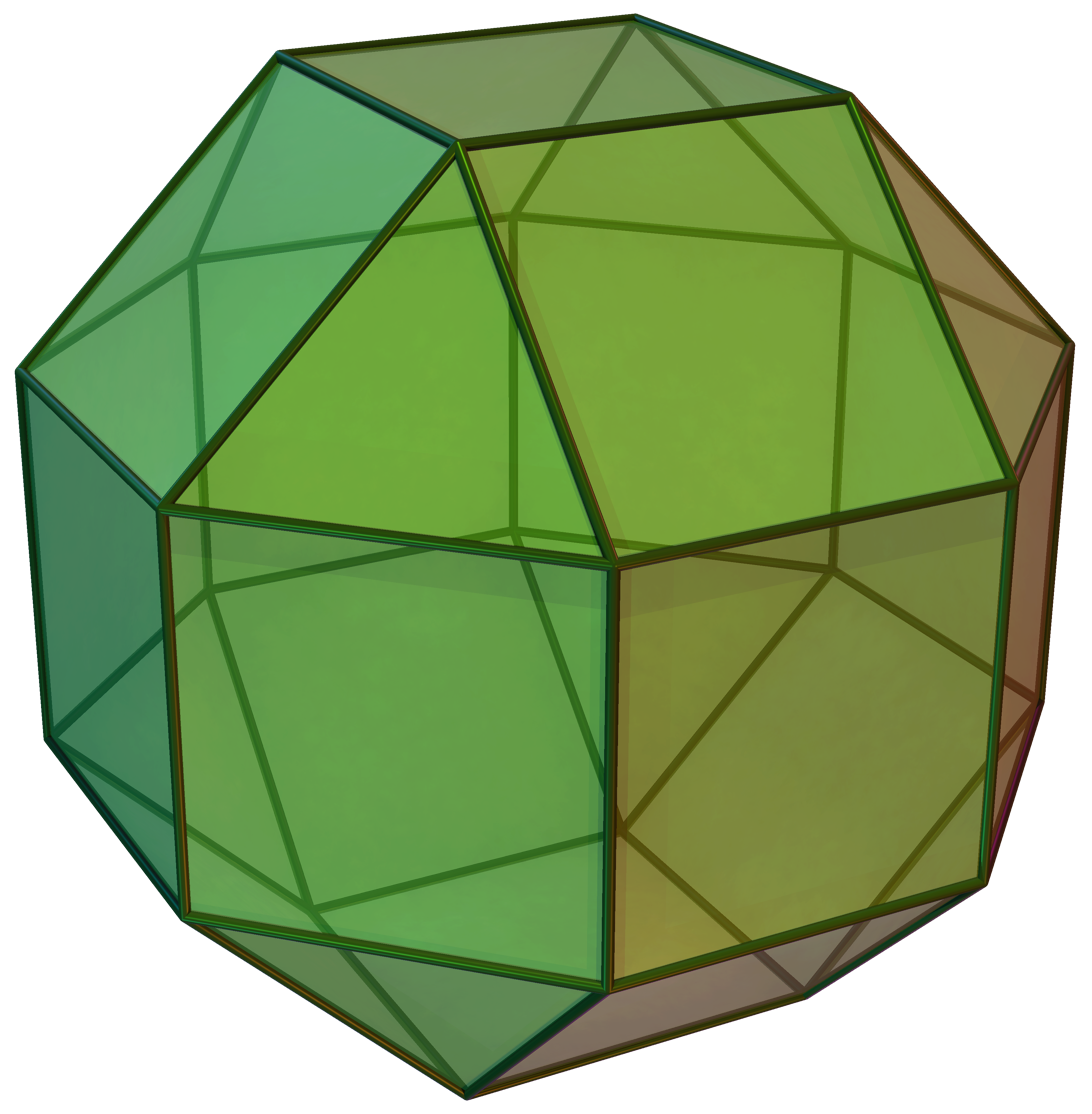
- Type: Archimedean; Uniform polyhedron
- Faces: 8 equilateral triangles 18 squares
- Edges: 48
- Vertices: 24
- Vertex configuration: $24 (3 \cdot 4^3)$
- Schläfli symbol: $r \begin{Bmatrix} 3 \\ 4 \end{Bmatrix}$
- Symmetry group: Octahedral symmetry $\mathrm{O}_\mathrm{h}$ Pyritohedral symmetry $\mathrm{T}_\mathrm{h}$
- Dihedral angle (degrees): square-to-square: 135° square-to-triangle: 144.7°
- Dual polyhedron: Deltoidal icositetrahedron

Vertex figure

Net

The rhombicuboctahedron or small rhombicuboctahedron is a polyhedron with 26 faces, consisting of 8 equilateral triangles and 18 squares. It was named by Johannes Kepler in his 1618 Harmonices Mundi, being short for truncated cuboctahedral rhombus, with cuboctahedral rhombus being his name for a rhombic dodecahedron.

The rhombicuboctahedron is an Archimedean solid, and its dual is a Catalan solid, the deltoidal icositetrahedron. The elongated square gyrobicupola, the 37th Johnson solid, is a polyhedron that is similar to a rhombicuboctahedron, but it is not an Archimedean solid because it is not vertex-transitive. The rhombicuboctahedron is found in diverse cultures in architecture, toys, the arts, and elsewhere.

== Construction ==
The rhombicuboctahedron can be constructed from a cube by drawing a smaller one in the middle of each face, parallel to the cube's edges. After removing the edges of a cube, the squares may be joined by adding more squares adjacent to them, and the corners may be filled by the equilateral triangles. Another way to construct the rhombicuboctahedron is by attaching two regular square cupolas into the bases of a regular octagonal prism.

As an expansion of a cube or regular octahedron

A rhombicuboctahedron may also be known as an expanded octahedron or expanded cube. This is because the rhombicuboctahedron may also be constructed by separating and pushing away the faces of a cube or a regular octahedron from their centroid (in blue or red, respectively, in the animation), and filling between them with the squares and equilateral triangles. This construction process is known as expansion. By using all of these methods above, the rhombicuboctahedron has 8 equilateral triangles and 18 squares as its faces. Relatedly, it may also be constructed by cutting all edges and vertices of either cube or a regular octahedron, a process known as cantellation.

Cartesian coordinates of a rhombicuboctahedron with an edge length 2 are the permutations of $\left(\pm \left(1 + \sqrt{2}\right), \pm 1, \pm 1 \right)$.

== Properties ==
=== Measurement and metric properties ===
To find the surface area of a rhombicuboctahedron, one can calculate the total area of all polygonal faces, namely 8 equilateral triangles and 18 squares. Its volume can be determined by slicing it into two square cupolas and one octagonal prism and then adding their volume. Let $a$ be the edge length of a rhombicuboctahedron, then the formulation for its surface area $A$ and volume $V$ are:
$$\begin{align}
A &= \left(18+2\sqrt{3}\right)a^2 &\approx 21.464a^2,\\
V &= \frac{12+10\sqrt{2}}{3}a^3 &\approx 8.714a^3.
\end{align}$$

The dihedral angle of a rhombicuboctahedron can be determined by adding the dihedral angle of a square cupola and an octagonal prism:

- The dihedral angle of a rhombicuboctahedron between two adjacent squares on both the top and bottom is that of a square cupola, 135°. The dihedral angle of an octagonal prism between two adjacent squares is the internal angle of a regular octagon 135°. The dihedral angle between two adjacent squares on the edge where a square cupola is attached to an octagonal prism is the sum of the dihedral angle of a square cupola, square-to-octagon, and the dihedral angle of an octagonal prism, square-to-octagon, 45° + 90° = 135°. Therefore, the dihedral angle of a rhombicuboctahedron for every two adjacent squares is 135°.
- The dihedral angle of a rhombicuboctahedron square-to-triangle is that of a square cupola between those 144.7°. The dihedral angle between square-to-triangle, on the edge where a square cupola is attached to an octagonal prism, is the sum of the dihedral angle of a square cupola triangle-to-octagon and the dihedral angle of an octagonal prism square-to-octagon, 54.7° + 90° = 144.7°. Therefore, the dihedral angle of a rhombicuboctahedron for every square-to-triangle is 144.7°.

A rhombicuboctahedron has the Rupert property, meaning there is a polyhedron with the same or larger size that can pass through its hole.

=== Symmetry and its classification family ===
3D model of a rhombicuboctahedron

The rhombicuboctahedron has the same symmetry as a cube and regular octahedron, the octahedral symmetry $\mathrm{O}_\mathrm{h}$. However, the rhombicuboctahedron also has a second set of distortions with six rectangular and sixteen trapezoidal faces, which do not have octahedral symmetry but rather pyritohedral symmetry $\mathrm{T}_\mathrm{h}$, so they are invariant under the same rotations as the tetrahedron but different reflections. It is centrosymmetric, meaning its symmetric is interchangeable by the appearance of inversion center. It is also non-chiral; that is, it is congruent to its own mirror image.

The rhombicuboctahedron is an Archimedean solid, meaning it is a highly symmetric and semi-regular polyhedron, and two or more different regular polygonal faces meet in a vertex. The polygonal faces that meet for every vertex are one equilateral triangle and three squares, and the vertex figure is denoted as $3 \cdot 4^3$. Its dual is deltoidal icositetrahedron, a Catalan solid, shares the same symmetry as the rhombicuboctahedron.

The elongated square gyrobicupola is the only polyhedron resembling the rhombicuboctahedron. The difference is that the elongated square gyrobicupola is constructed by twisting one of its cupolae. It was once considered as the 14th Archimedean solid, until it was discovered that it is not vertex-transitive, categorizing it as the Johnson solid instead.

== Appearances ==
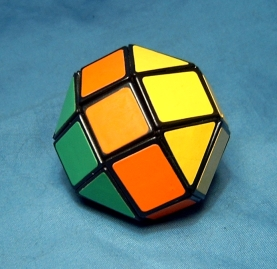
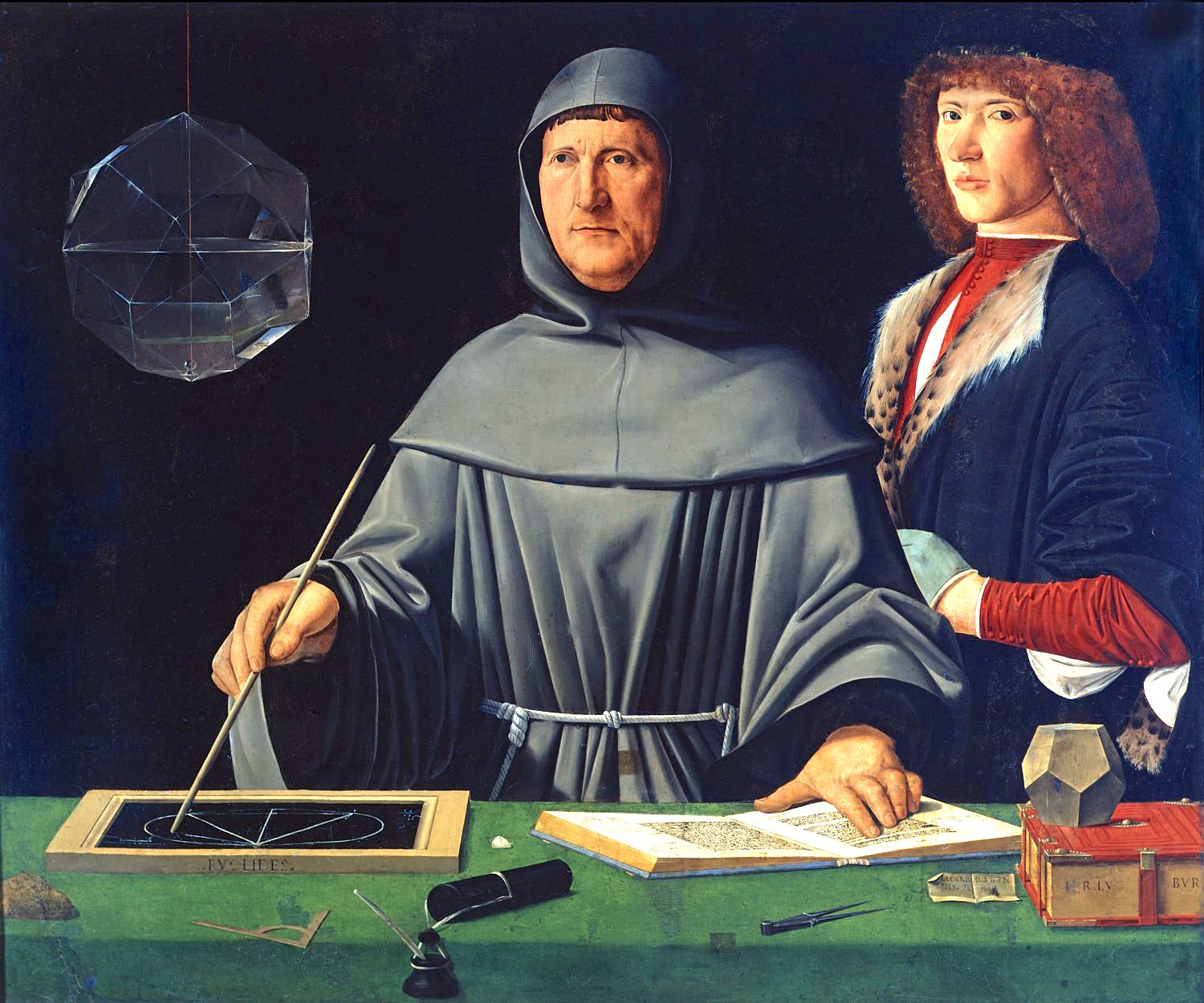
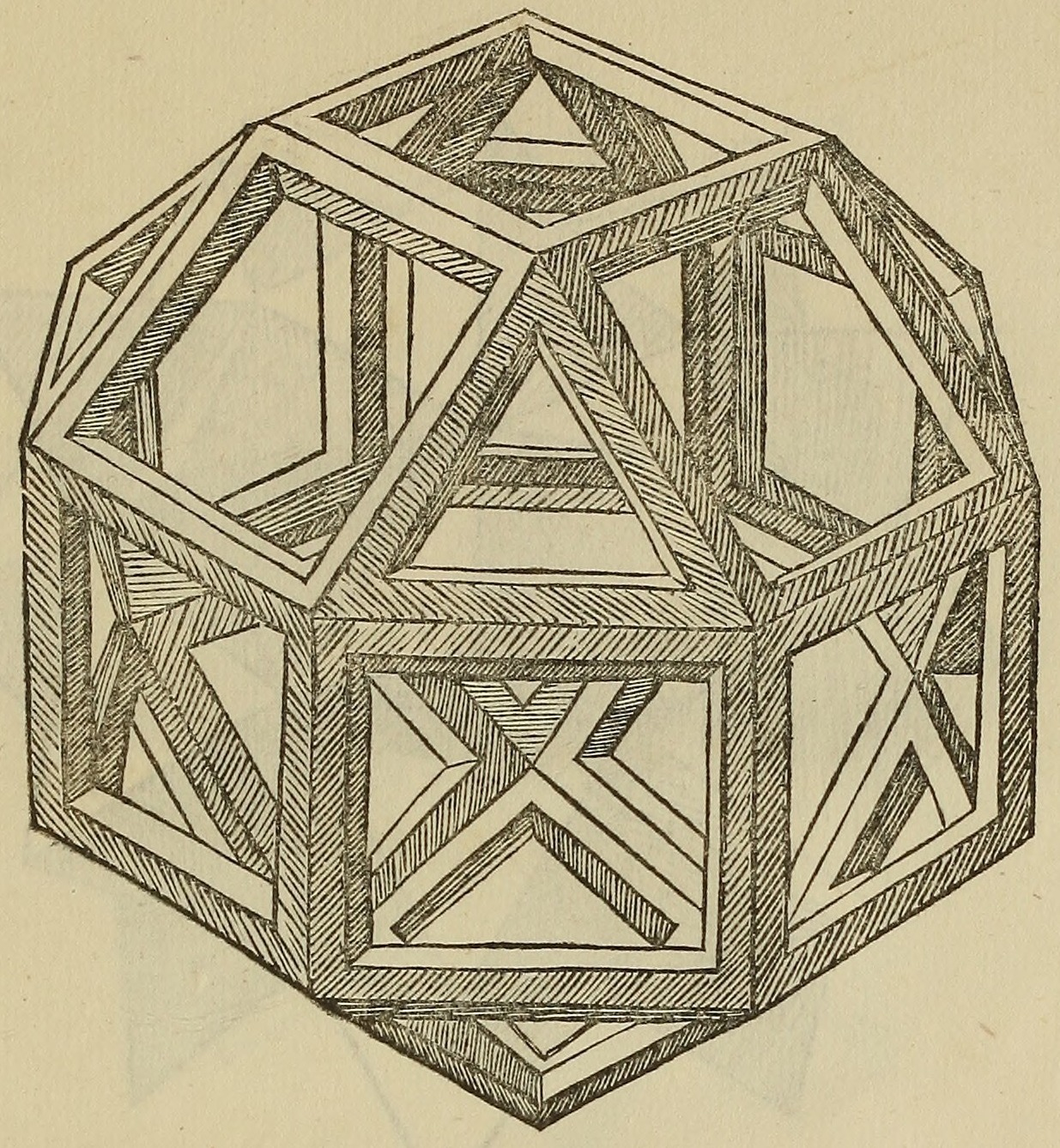
Many rhombicuboctahedral objects such as National Library in Minsk (top left) and Rubik's Cube variation (top right). The rhombicuboctahedron may also appear in art, as in Portrait of Luca Pacioli (bottom left) and Leonardo da Vinci's 1509 illustration in Divina proportione (bottom right).

The rhombicuboctahedron sometimes appears in architecture, with an example being the building of the National Library located at Minsk. The Wilson House by American architect Bruce Goff is another example of a rhombicuboctahedral building, although its module was depicted as a truncated cube in which the edges are all cut off. It was built during the Second World War and Operation Breakthrough in the 1960s.

The rhombicuboctahedron may also be found in toys. For example, if the lines along which a Rubik's Cube can be turned are projected onto a sphere, they are topologically identical to a rhombicuboctahedron's edges. Variants using the Rubik's Cube mechanism have been produced, which closely resemble the rhombicuboctahedron. During the Rubik's Cube craze of the 1980s, at least two twisty puzzles sold had the form of a rhombicuboctahedron (the mechanism was similar to that of a Rubik's Cube) Another example may be found in dice from Corfe Castle, each of whose square faces have marks of pairs of letters and pips.

The rhombicuboctahedron may also appear in art. An example is the 1495 Portrait of Luca Pacioli, traditionally attributed to Jacopo de' Barbari, which includes a glass rhombicuboctahedron half-filled with water, which may have been painted by Leonardo da Vinci. The first printed version of the rhombicuboctahedron was by Leonardo da Vinci and appeared in Pacioli's Divina proportione (1509).

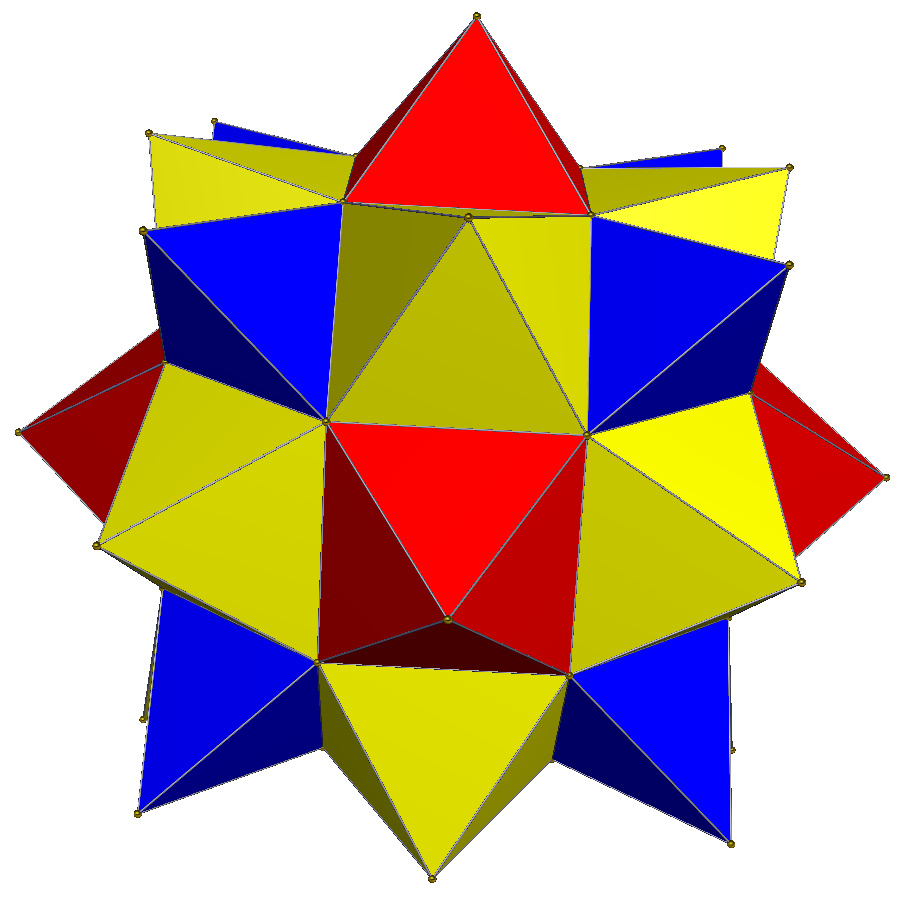
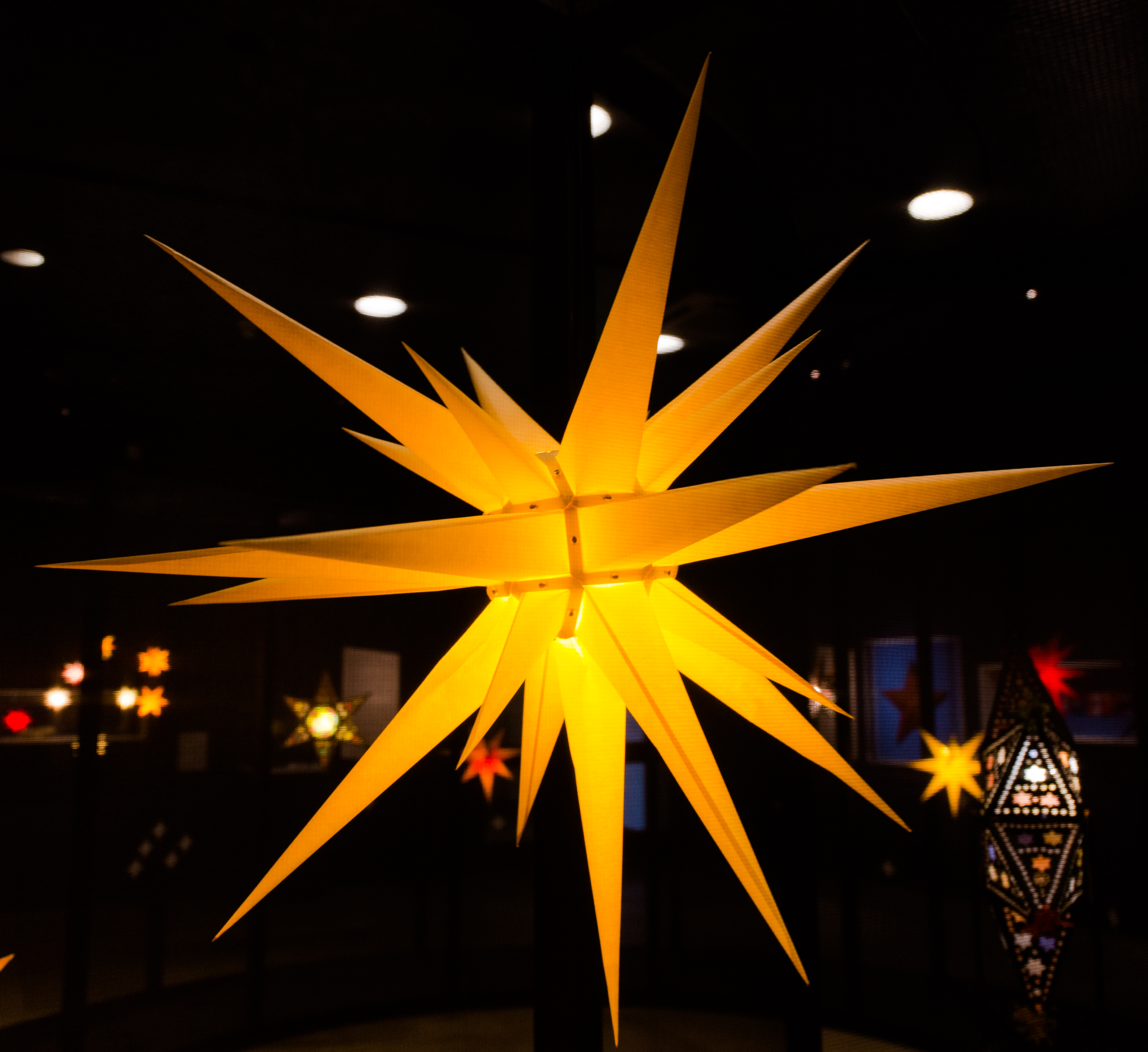
A rhombicuboctahedron with pyramids augmented to its faces and Moravian star

When the bases of pyramids are attached to the faces of a rhombicuboctahedron, the resulting polyhedron is a non-convex star polyhedron. This solid is used as a Moravian star, a divine symbol for Christianity regarding the birth of Jesus Christ known as the Star of Bethlehem.

== See also ==
- Chamfered cube, obtained by augmenting the triangles to obtain non-uniform hexagon faces
- Truncated rhombicuboctahedron, a rhombicuboctahedron with all of its vertices being truncated.
- Small cubicuboctahedron and small rhombihexahedron, non-convex uniform polyhedra resembling the rhombicuboctahedron.
- Rhombicuboctahedral prism, where a rhombicuboctahedron is one of its vertex figures.
