= Snub (geometry) =

Geometric operation applied to a polyhedron

The two snubbed Archimedean solids
| Snub cube or Snub cuboctahedron | Snub dodecahedron or Snub icosidodecahedron |

Two chiral copies of the snub cube, as alternated (red or green) vertices of the truncated cuboctahedron

A snub cube can be constructed from a rhombicuboctahedron by rotating the 6 blue square faces until the 12 white square faces become pairs of equilateral triangle faces

Transformation of a rhombicuboctahedron into a snub cube visualized

In geometry, a snub is an operation applied to a polyhedron. The term originates from Kepler's names of two Archimedean solids, for the snub cube (cubus simus) and snub dodecahedron (dodecaedron simum).

In general, snubs have chiral symmetry with two forms: with clockwise or counterclockwise orientation. By Kepler's names, a snub can be seen as an expansion of a regular polyhedron: moving the faces apart, twisting them about their centers, adding new polygons centered on the original vertices, and adding pairs of triangles fitting between the original edges.

Transformation of a cube (left) and a regular octahedron (right) into a snub cube
Transformation of a regular dodecahedron (left) and a regular icosahedron (right) into a snub dodecahedron

The terminology was generalized by Coxeter, with a slightly different definition, for a wider set of uniform polytopes.

== Conway snubs ==
John Conway explored generalized polyhedron operators, defining what is now called Conway polyhedron notation, which can be applied to polyhedra and tilings. Conway calls Coxeter's operation a semi-snub.

In this notation, snub is defined by the dual and gyro operators, as s = dg, and it is equivalent to an alternation of a truncation of an ambo operator. Conway's notation itself avoids Coxeter's alternation (half) operation since it only applies for polyhedra with even-sided faces.

Snubbed regular figures
| Forms to snub | Polyhedra | | | Euclidean tilings | | Hyperbolic tilings |
|---|---|---|---|---|---|---|
| Names | Tetrahedron | Cube or octahedron | Icosahedron or dodecahedron | Square tiling | Hexagonal tiling or Triangular tiling | Heptagonal tiling or Order-7 triangular tiling |
| Images | | | | | | |
| Snubbed form Conway notation | sT | sC = sO | sI = sD | sQ | sH = sΔ | sΔ_{7} |
| Image | | | | | | |

In 4-dimensions, Conway suggests the snub 24-cell should be called a semi-snub 24-cell because, unlike 3-dimensional snub polyhedra are alternated omnitruncated forms, it is not an alternated omnitruncated 24-cell. It is instead actually an alternated truncated 24-cell.

== Coxeter's snubs, regular and quasiregular ==
Snub cube, derived from cube or cuboctahedron
| | Seed | Rectified r | Truncated t | Alternated h |
| Name | Cube | Cuboctahedron Rectified cube | Truncated cuboctahedron Cantitruncated cube | Snub cuboctahedron Snub rectified cube |
| Conway notation | C | CO rC | tCO trC or trO | htCO = sCO htrC = srC |
| Schläfli symbol | {4,3} | $\begin{Bmatrix} 4 \\ 3 \end{Bmatrix}$ or r{4,3} | $t \begin{Bmatrix} 4 \\ 3 \end{Bmatrix}$ or tr{4,3} | $ht \begin{Bmatrix} 4 \\ 3 \end{Bmatrix} = s \begin{Bmatrix} 4 \\ 3 \end{Bmatrix}$ htr{4,3} = sr{4,3} |
| Coxeter diagram | | or | or | or |
| Image | | | | |

Coxeter's snub terminology is slightly different, meaning an alternated truncation, deriving the snub cube as a snub cuboctahedron, and the snub dodecahedron as a snub icosidodecahedron. This definition is used in the naming of two Johnson solids: the snub disphenoid and the snub square antiprism, and of higher dimensional polytopes, such as the 4-dimensional snub 24-cell, with extended Schläfli symbol s{3,4,3}, and Coxeter diagram.

A regular polyhedron (or tiling), with Schläfli symbol $\begin{Bmatrix} p , q \end{Bmatrix}$, and Coxeter diagram, has truncation defined as $t \begin{Bmatrix} p , q \end{Bmatrix}$, and, and has snub defined as an alternated truncation $ht \begin{Bmatrix} p , q \end{Bmatrix} = s \begin{Bmatrix} p , q \end{Bmatrix}$, and. This alternated construction requires q to be even.

A quasiregular polyhedron, with Schläfli symbol $\begin{Bmatrix} p \\ q \end{Bmatrix}$ or r{p,q}, and Coxeter diagram or, has quasiregular truncation defined as $t\begin{Bmatrix} p \\ q \end{Bmatrix}$ or tr{p,q}, and or, and has quasiregular snub defined as an alternated truncated rectification $ht\begin{Bmatrix} p \\ q \end{Bmatrix} = s\begin{Bmatrix} p \\ q \end{Bmatrix}$ or htr{p,q} = sr{p,q}, and or.

For example, Kepler's snub cube is derived from the quasiregular cuboctahedron, with a vertical Schläfli symbol $\begin{Bmatrix} 4 \\ 3 \end{Bmatrix}$, and Coxeter diagram, and so is more explicitly called a snub cuboctahedron, expressed by a vertical Schläfli symbol $s\begin{Bmatrix} 4 \\ 3 \end{Bmatrix}$, and Coxeter diagram. The snub cuboctahedron is the alternation of the truncated cuboctahedron, $t\begin{Bmatrix} 4 \\ 3 \end{Bmatrix}$, and.

Regular polyhedra with even-order vertices can also be snubbed as alternated truncations, like the snub octahedron, as $s\begin{Bmatrix} 3 , 4 \end{Bmatrix}$,, is the alternation of the truncated octahedron, $t\begin{Bmatrix} 3 , 4 \end{Bmatrix}$, and. The snub octahedron represents the pseudoicosahedron, a regular icosahedron with pyritohedral symmetry.

The snub tetratetrahedron, as $s\begin{Bmatrix} 3 \\ 3 \end{Bmatrix}$, and, is the alternation of the truncated tetrahedral symmetry form, $t\begin{Bmatrix} 3 \\ 3 \end{Bmatrix}$, and.

| | Seed | Truncated t | Alternated h |
| Name | Octahedron | Truncated octahedron | Snub octahedron |
| Conway notation | O | tO | htO or sO |
| Schläfli symbol | {3,4} | t{3,4} | ht{3,4} = s{3,4} |
| Coxeter diagram | | | |
| Image | | | |

Coxeter's snub operation also allows n-antiprisms to be defined as $s\begin{Bmatrix} 2 \\ n \end{Bmatrix}$ or $s\begin{Bmatrix} 2 , 2n \end{Bmatrix}$, based on n-prisms $t\begin{Bmatrix} 2 \\ n \end{Bmatrix}$ or $t\begin{Bmatrix} 2 , 2n \end{Bmatrix}$, while $\begin{Bmatrix} 2 , n \end{Bmatrix}$ is a regular n-hosohedron, a degenerate polyhedron, but a valid tiling on the sphere with digon or lune-shaped faces.

Snub hosohedra, {2,2p}
| Image | | | | | | | | |
| Coxeter diagrams | | | | | | | ...... | |
| Schläfli symbols | s{2,4} | s{2,6} | s{2,8} | s{2,10} | s{2,12} | s{2,14} | s{2,16}... | s{2,∞} |
| Schläfli symbols | sr{2,2} $s \begin{Bmatrix} 2 \\ 2 \end{Bmatrix}$ | sr{2,3} $s \begin{Bmatrix} 2 \\ 3 \end{Bmatrix}$ | sr{2,4} $s \begin{Bmatrix} 2 \\ 4 \end{Bmatrix}$ | sr{2,5} $s \begin{Bmatrix} 2 \\ 5 \end{Bmatrix}$ | sr{2,6} $s \begin{Bmatrix} 2 \\ 6 \end{Bmatrix}$ | sr{2,7} $s \begin{Bmatrix} 2 \\ 7 \end{Bmatrix}$ | sr{2,8}... $s \begin{Bmatrix} 2 \\ 8 \end{Bmatrix}$... | sr{2,∞} $s \begin{Bmatrix} 2 \\ \infin \end{Bmatrix}$ |
| Conway notation | A2 = T | A3 = O | A4 | A5 | A6 | A7 | A8... | A∞ |

The same process applies for snub tilings:

| Triangular tiling Δ | Truncated triangular tiling tΔ | Snub triangular tiling htΔ = sΔ |
|---|---|---|
| {3,6} | t{3,6} | ht{3,6} = s{3,6} |

=== Examples ===
Snubs based on {p,4}
| Space | Spherical | | Euclidean | Hyperbolic | | | | |
|---|---|---|---|---|---|---|---|---|
| Image | | | | | | | | |
| Coxeter diagram | | | | | | | | ... |
| Schläfli symbol | s{2,4} | s{3,4} | s{4,4} | s{5,4} | s{6,4} | s{7,4} | s{8,4} | ...s{∞,4} |

Quasiregular snubs based on r{p,3}
| Conway notation | Spherical | | | | Euclidean | Hyperbolic | | |
|---|---|---|---|---|---|---|---|---|
| Image | | | | | | | | |
| Coxeter diagram | | | | | | | | ... |
| Schläfli symbol | sr{2,3} | sr{3,3} | sr{4,3} | sr{5,3} | sr{6,3} | sr{7,3} | sr{8,3} | ...sr{∞,3} |
| Schläfli symbol | $s\begin{Bmatrix} 2 \\3 \end{Bmatrix}$ | $s\begin{Bmatrix} 3 \\3 \end{Bmatrix}$ | $s\begin{Bmatrix} 4 \\3 \end{Bmatrix}$ | $s\begin{Bmatrix} 5 \\3 \end{Bmatrix}$ | $s\begin{Bmatrix} 6 \\3 \end{Bmatrix}$ | $s\begin{Bmatrix} 7 \\3 \end{Bmatrix}$ | $s\begin{Bmatrix} 8 \\3 \end{Bmatrix}$ | $s\begin{Bmatrix} \infin \\3 \end{Bmatrix}$ |
| Conway notation | A3 | sT | sC or sO | sD or sI | sΗ or sΔ | | | |

Quasiregular snubs based on r{p,4}
| Space | Spherical | | Euclidean | Hyperbolic | | | | |
|---|---|---|---|---|---|---|---|---|
| Image | | | | | | | | |
| Coxeter diagram | | | | | | | | ... |
| Schläfli symbol | sr{2,4} | sr{3,4} | sr{4,4} | sr{5,4} | sr{6,4} | sr{7,4} | sr{8,4} | ...sr{∞,4} |
| Schläfli symbol | $s\begin{Bmatrix} 2 \\4 \end{Bmatrix}$ | $s\begin{Bmatrix} 3 \\4 \end{Bmatrix}$ | $s\begin{Bmatrix} 4 \\4 \end{Bmatrix}$ | $s\begin{Bmatrix} 5 \\4 \end{Bmatrix}$ | $s\begin{Bmatrix} 6 \\4 \end{Bmatrix}$ | $s\begin{Bmatrix} 7 \\4 \end{Bmatrix}$ | $s\begin{Bmatrix} 8 \\4 \end{Bmatrix}$ | $s\begin{Bmatrix} \infin \\4 \end{Bmatrix}$ |
| Conway notation | A4 | sC or sO | sQ | | | | | |

=== Nonuniform snub polyhedra ===
Nonuniform polyhedra with all even-valance vertices can be snubbed, including some infinite sets; for example:

Snub bipyramids sdt{2,p}
Snub square bipyramid
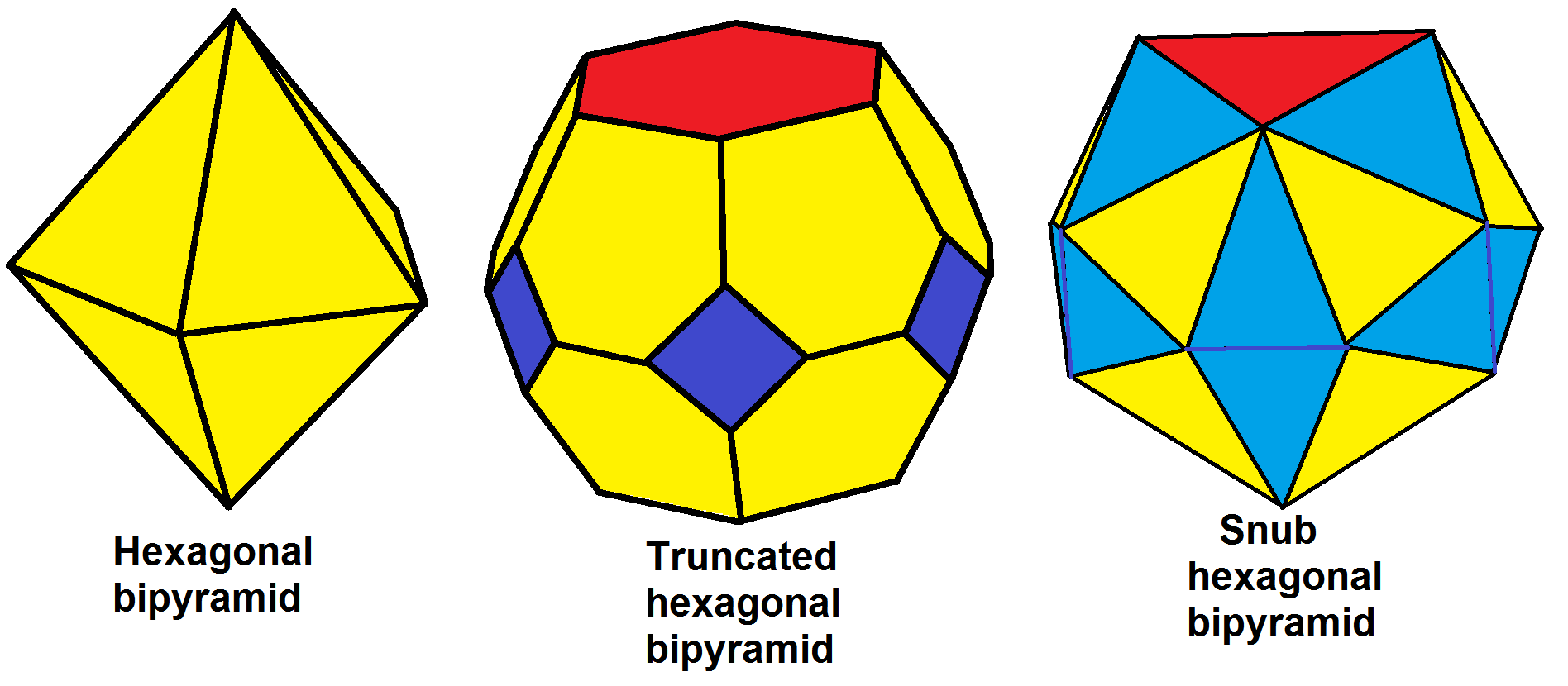
Snub hexagonal bipyramid

Snub rectified bipyramids srdt{2,p}
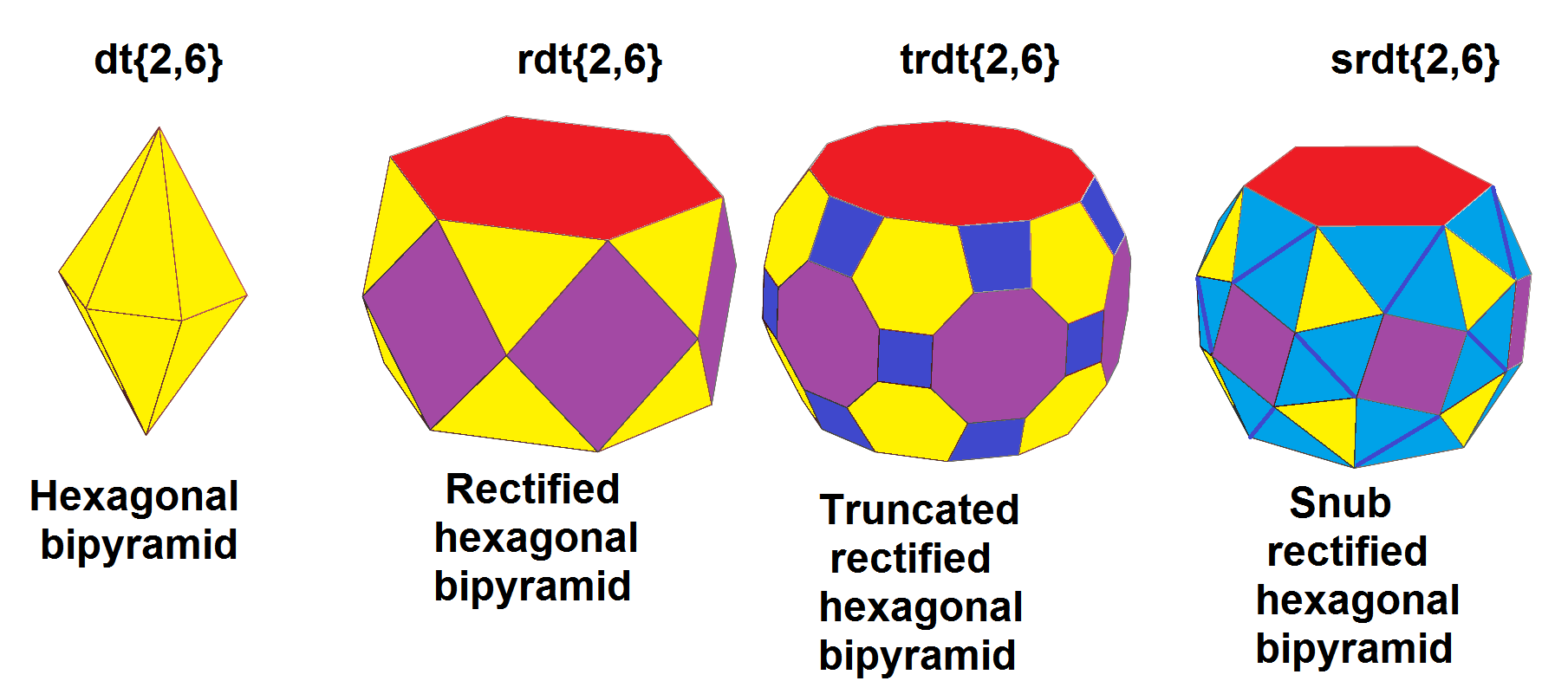

Snub antiprisms s{2,2p}
| Image | | | | ... |
| Schläfli symbols | ss{2,4} | ss{2,6} | ss{2,8} | ss{2,10}... |
| Schläfli symbols | ssr{2,2} $ss \begin{Bmatrix} 2 \\ 2 \end{Bmatrix}$ | ssr{2,3} $ss \begin{Bmatrix} 2 \\ 3 \end{Bmatrix}$ | ssr{2,4} $ss \begin{Bmatrix} 2 \\ 4 \end{Bmatrix}$ | ssr{2,5}... $ss \begin{Bmatrix} 2 \\ 5 \end{Bmatrix}$ |

=== Coxeter's uniform snub star-polyhedra ===
Snub star-polyhedra are constructed by their Schwarz triangle (p q r), with rational ordered mirror-angles, and all mirrors active and alternated.

Snubbed uniform star-polyhedra
| sr{3/2,3/2} | s{(3,3,5/2)} | sr{5,5/2} | s{(3,5,5/3)} | sr{5/2,3} |
| sr{5/3,5} | s{(5/2,5/3,3)} | sr{5/3,3} | s{(3/2,3/2,5/2)} | sr{3/2,5/3} |

The great dirhombicosidodecahedron is also a snub, but it relates to a spherical quadrilateral (3/2 5/3 3 5/2) instead.

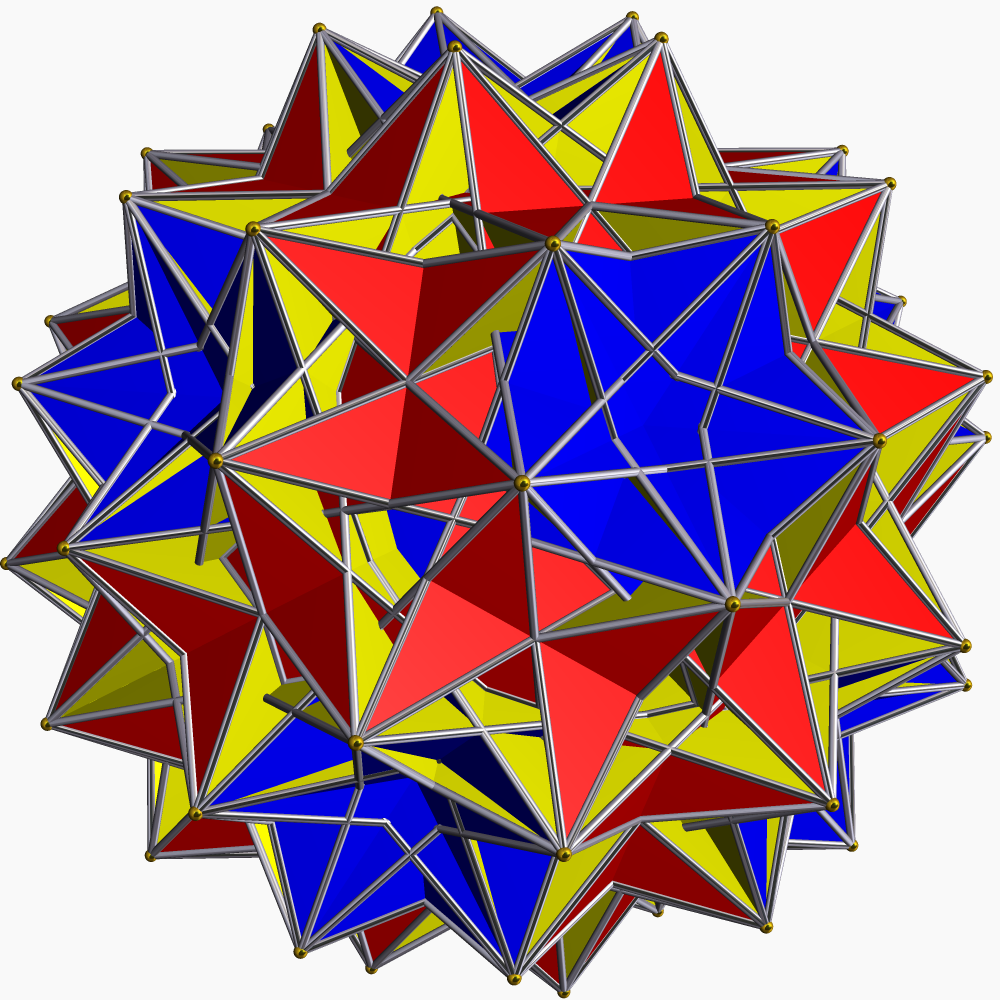

=== Coxeter's higher-dimensional snubbed polytopes and honeycombs ===
In general, a regular polychoron with Schläfli symbol $\begin{Bmatrix} p , q, r \end{Bmatrix}$, and Coxeter diagram, has a snub with extended Schläfli symbol $s \begin{Bmatrix} p , q, r \end{Bmatrix}$, and.

A rectified polychoron $\begin{Bmatrix} p \\ q, r \end{Bmatrix}$ = r{p,q,r}, and has snub symbol $s\begin{Bmatrix} p \\ q , r \end{Bmatrix}$ = sr{p,q,r}, and.

=== Examples ===
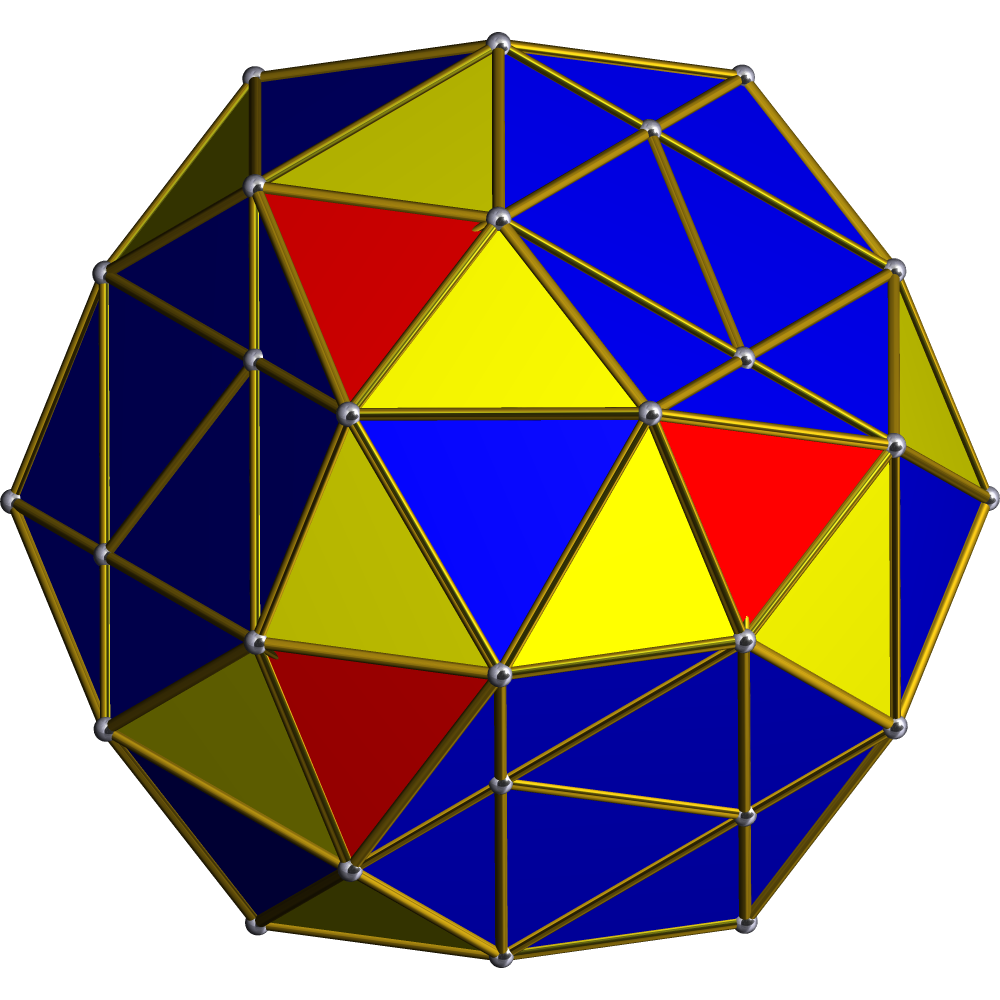
Orthogonal projection of snub 24-cell

There is only one uniform convex snub in 4-dimensions, the snub 24-cell. The regular 24-cell has Schläfli symbol, $\begin{Bmatrix} 3 , 4, 3 \end{Bmatrix}$, and Coxeter diagram, and the snub 24-cell is represented by $s\begin{Bmatrix} 3 , 4, 3 \end{Bmatrix}$, Coxeter diagram. It also has an index 6 lower symmetry constructions as $s\left\{\begin{array}{l}3\\3\\3\end{array}\right\}$ or s{3^{1,1,1}} and, and an index 3 subsymmetry as $s\begin{Bmatrix} 3 \\ 3 , 4 \end{Bmatrix}$ or sr{3,3,4}, and or.

The related snub 24-cell honeycomb can be seen as a $s\begin{Bmatrix} 3 , 4, 3, 3 \end{Bmatrix}$ or s{3,4,3,3}, and, and lower symmetry $s\begin{Bmatrix} 3 \\ 3 , 4, 3 \end{Bmatrix}$ or sr{3,3,4,3} and or, and lowest symmetry form as $s\left\{\begin{array}{l}3\\3\\3\\3\end{array}\right\}$ or s{3^{1,1,1,1}} and.

A Euclidean honeycomb is an alternated hexagonal slab honeycomb, s{2,6,3}, and or sr{2,3,6}, and or sr{2,3^{[3]}}, and.

Another Euclidean (scaliform) honeycomb is an alternated square slab honeycomb, s{2,4,4}, and or sr{2,4^{1,1}} and:

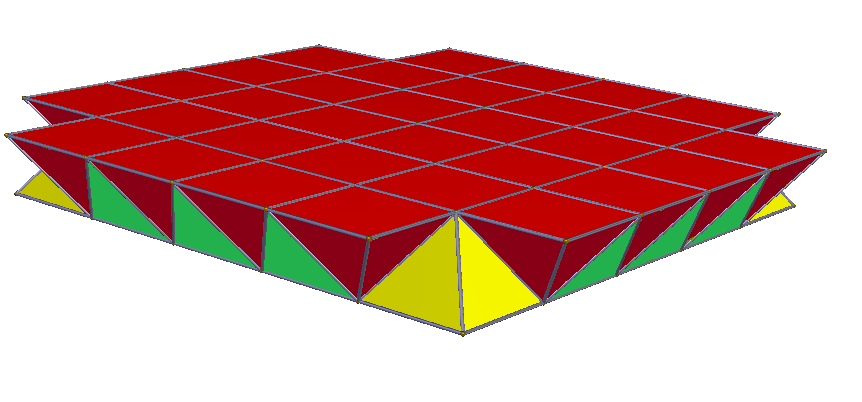

The only uniform snub hyperbolic uniform honeycomb is the snub hexagonal tiling honeycomb, as s{3,6,3} and, which can also be constructed as an alternated hexagonal tiling honeycomb, h{6,3,3},. It is also constructed as s{3^{[3,3]}} and.

Another hyperbolic (scaliform) honeycomb is a snub order-4 octahedral honeycomb, s{3,4,4}, and.

== See also ==
- Snub polyhedron

Polyhedron operators
| Seed | Truncation | Rectification | Bitruncation | Dual | Expansion | Omnitruncation | Alternations | | |
|---|---|---|---|---|---|---|---|---|---|
| t_{0}{p,q} {p,q} | t_{01}{p,q} t{p,q} | t_{1}{p,q} r{p,q} | t_{12}{p,q} 2t{p,q} | t_{2}{p,q} 2r{p,q} | t_{02}{p,q} rr{p,q} | t_{012}{p,q} tr{p,q} | ht_{0}{p,q} h{q,p} | ht_{12}{p,q} s{q,p} | ht_{012}{p,q} sr{p,q} |
