= Snub polyhedron =

Polyhedron resulting from the snub operation

Polyhedron
Class	Number and properties
Platonic solids	(5, convex, regular)
Archimedean solids	(13, convex, uniform)
Kepler–Poinsot polyhedra	(4, regular, non-convex)
Uniform polyhedra	(75, uniform)
Prismatoid: prisms, antiprisms etc.	(4 infinite uniform classes)
Polyhedra tilings	(11 regular, in the plane)
Quasi-regular polyhedra	(8)
Johnson solids	(92, convex, non-uniform)
Bipyramids	(infinite)
Pyramids	(infinite)
Stellations	Stellations
Polyhedral compounds	(5 regular)
Deltahedra	(Deltahedra, equilateral triangle faces)
Snub polyhedra	(12 uniform, not mirror image)
Zonohedron	(Zonohedra, faces have 180°symmetry)
Dual polyhedron
Self-dual polyhedron	(infinite)
Catalan solid	(13, Archimedean dual)

In geometry, a snub polyhedron is a polyhedron obtained by performing a snub operation: alternating a corresponding omnitruncated or truncated polyhedron, depending on the definition. Some, but not all, authors include antiprisms as snub polyhedra, as they are obtained by this construction from a degenerate "polyhedron" with only two faces (a dihedron).

Chiral snub polyhedra do not always have reflection symmetry and hence sometimes have two enantiomorphous (left- and right-handed) forms which are reflections of each other. Their symmetry groups are all point groups.

For example, the snub cube:

Snub polyhedra have Wythoff symbol | p q r and by extension, vertex configuration 3.p.3.q.3.r. Retrosnub polyhedra (a subset of the snub polyhedron, containing the great icosahedron, small retrosnub icosicosidodecahedron, and great retrosnub icosidodecahedron) still have this form of Wythoff symbol, but their vertex configurations are instead $\frac{(3.-p.3.-q.3.-r)}{2}.$

== List of snub polyhedra ==
=== Uniform ===
There are 12 uniform snub polyhedra, not including the antiprisms, the icosahedron as a snub tetrahedron, the great icosahedron as a retrosnub tetrahedron and the great disnub dirhombidodecahedron, also known as Skilling's figure.

When the Schwarz triangle of the snub polyhedron is isosceles, the snub polyhedron is not chiral. This is the case for the antiprisms, the icosahedron, the great icosahedron, the small snub icosicosidodecahedron, and the small retrosnub icosicosidodecahedron.

In the pictures of the snub derivation (showing a distorted snub polyhedron, topologically identical to the uniform version, arrived at from geometrically alternating the parent uniform omnitruncated polyhedron) where green is not present, the faces derived from alternation are coloured red and yellow, while the snub triangles are blue. Where green is present (only for the snub icosidodecadodecahedron and great snub dodecicosidodecahedron), the faces derived from alternation are red, yellow, and blue, while the snub triangles are green.

Snub polyhedron	Image	Original omnitruncated polyhedron	Image	Snub derivation	Symmetry group	Wythoff symbol Vertex description
Icosahedron (snub tetrahedron)		Truncated octahedron			I_{h} (T_{h})	| 3 3 2; 3.3.3.3.3
Great icosahedron (retrosnub tetrahedron)		Truncated octahedron			I_{h} (T_{h})	| 2 ^{3}/_{2} ^{3}/_{2}^{(3.3.3.3.3)}/_{2}
Snub cube or snub cuboctahedron		Truncated cuboctahedron			O	| 4 3 2; 3.3.3.3.4
Snub dodecahedron or snub icosidodecahedron		Truncated icosidodecahedron			I	| 5 3 2; 3.3.3.3.5
Small snub icosicosidodecahedron		Doubly covered truncated icosahedron			I_{h}	| 3 3 ^{5}/_{2} 3.3.3.3.3.^{5}/_{2}
Snub dodecadodecahedron		Small rhombidodecahedron with extra 12{^{10}/_{2}} faces			I	| 5 ^{5}/_{2} 2; 3.3.^{5}/_{2}.3.5
Snub icosidodecadodecahedron		Icositruncated dodecadodecahedron			I	| 5 3 ^{5}/_{3} 3.^{5}/_{3}.3.3.3.5
Great snub icosidodecahedron		Rhombicosahedron with extra 12{^{10}/_{2}} faces			I	| 3 ^{5}/_{2} 2; 3.3.^{5}/_{2}.3.3
Inverted snub dodecadodecahedron		Truncated dodecadodecahedron			I	| 5 2 ^{5}/_{3} 3.^{5}/_{3}.3.3.3.5
Great snub dodecicosidodecahedron		Great dodecicosahedron with extra 12{^{10}/_{2}} faces		no image yet	I	| 3 ^{5}/_{2} ^{5}/_{3} 3.^{5}/_{3}.3.^{5}/_{2}.3.3
Great inverted snub icosidodecahedron		Great truncated icosidodecahedron			I	| 3 2 ^{5}/_{3} 3.^{5}/_{3}.3.3.3
Small retrosnub icosicosidodecahedron		Doubly covered truncated icosahedron		no image yet	I_{h}	| ^{5}/_{2} ^{3}/_{2} ^{3}/_{2}^{(3.3.3.3.3.^{5}/_{2})}/_{2}
Great retrosnub icosidodecahedron		Great rhombidodecahedron with extra 20{^{6}/_{2}} faces		no image yet	I	| 2 ^{5}/_{3} ^{3}/_{2}^{(3.3.3.^{5}/_{2}.3)}/_{2}
Great dirhombicosidodecahedron		—	—	—	I_{h}	| ^{3}/_{2} ^{5}/_{3} 3 ^{5}/_{2}^{(4.^{3}/_{2}.4.^{5}/_{3}.4.3.4.^{5}/_{2})}/_{2}
Great disnub dirhombidodecahedron		—	—	—	I_{h}	| (^{3}/_{2}) ^{5}/_{3} (3) ^{5}/_{2}^{(^{3}/_{2}.^{3}/_{2}.^{3}/_{2}.4.^{5}/_{3}.4.3.3.3.4.^{5}/_{2}.4)}/_{2}

Notes:

- The icosahedron, snub cube and snub dodecahedron are the only three convex ones. They are obtained by snubification of the truncated octahedron, truncated cuboctahedron and the truncated icosidodecahedron - the three convex truncated quasiregular polyhedra.
- The only snub polyhedron with the chiral octahedral group of symmetries is the snub cube.
- Only the icosahedron and the great icosahedron are also regular polyhedra. They are also deltahedra.
- Only the icosahedron, great icosahedron, small snub icosicosidodecahedron, small retrosnub icosicosidodecahedron, great dirhombicosidodecahedron, and great disnub dirhombidodecahedron also have reflective symmetries.

There is also the infinite set of antiprisms. They are formed from prisms, which are truncated hosohedra, degenerate regular polyhedra. Those up to hexagonal are listed below. In the pictures showing the snub derivation, the faces derived from alternation (of the prism bases) are coloured red, and the snub triangles are coloured yellow. The exception is the tetrahedron, for which all the faces are derived as red snub triangles, as alternating the square bases of the cube results in degenerate digons as faces.

Snub polyhedron	Image	Original omnitruncated polyhedron	Image	Snub derivation	Symmetry group	Wythoff symbol Vertex description
Tetrahedron		Cube			T_{d} (D_{2d})	| 2 2 2; 3.3.3
Octahedron		Hexagonal prism			O_{h} (D_{3d})	| 3 2 2; 3.3.3.3
Square antiprism		Octagonal prism			D_{4d}	| 4 2 2; 3.4.3.3
Pentagonal antiprism		Decagonal prism			D_{5d}	| 5 2 2; 3.5.3.3
Pentagrammic antiprism		Doubly covered pentagonal prism			D_{5h}	| ^{5}/_{2} 2 2; 3.^{5}/_{2}.3.3
Pentagrammic crossed-antiprism		Decagrammic prism			D_{5d}	| 2 2 ^{5}/_{3} 3.^{5}/_{3}.3.3
Hexagonal antiprism		Dodecagonal prism			D_{6d}	| 6 2 2; 3.6.3.3

Notes:

- Two of these polyhedra may be constructed from the first two snub polyhedra in the list starting with the icosahedron: the pentagonal antiprism is a parabidiminished icosahedron and a pentagrammic crossed-antiprism is a parabidiminished great icosahedron, also known as a parabireplenished great icosahedron.

=== Non-uniform ===
Two Johnson solids are snub polyhedra: the snub disphenoid and the snub square antiprism. Neither is chiral.

Snub polyhedron	Image	Original polyhedron	Image	Symmetry group
Snub disphenoid		Disphenoid		D_{2d}
Snub square antiprism		Square antiprism		D_{4d}

== Bibliography ==
- Coxeter, Harold Scott MacDonald; Longuet-Higgins, M. S.; Miller, J. C. P. (1954), "Uniform polyhedra", Philosophical Transactions of the Royal Society of London. Series A. Mathematical and Physical Sciences, 246 (916): 401–450, Bibcode:1954RSPTA.246..401C, doi:10.1098/rsta.1954.0003, ISSN 0080-4614, JSTOR 91532, MR 0062446, S2CID 202575183
- Wenninger, Magnus (1974). Polyhedron Models. Cambridge University Press. ISBN 0-521-09859-9.
- Skilling, J. (1975), "The complete set of uniform polyhedra", Philosophical Transactions of the Royal Society of London. Series A. Mathematical and Physical Sciences, 278 (1278): 111–135, Bibcode:1975RSPTA.278..111S, doi:10.1098/rsta.1975.0022, ISSN 0080-4614, JSTOR 74475, MR 0365333, S2CID 122634260
- Mäder, R. E. Uniform Polyhedra. Mathematica J. 3, 48-57, 1993.

Polyhedron operators
Seed	Truncation	Rectification	Bitruncation	Dual	Expansion	Omnitruncation	Alternations		
t_{0}{p,q} {p,q}	t_{01}{p,q} t{p,q}	t_{1}{p,q} r{p,q}	t_{12}{p,q} 2t{p,q}	t_{2}{p,q} 2r{p,q}	t_{02}{p,q} rr{p,q}	t_{012}{p,q} tr{p,q}	ht_{0}{p,q} h{q,p}	ht_{12}{p,q} s{q,p}	ht_{012}{p,q} sr{p,q}
