= Omnitruncated polyhedron =

In geometry, an omnitruncated polyhedron is a truncated quasiregular polyhedron. When they are alternated, they produce the snub polyhedra.

All omnitruncated polyhedra are considered as zonohedra. They have Wythoff symbol p q r | and vertex figures as 2p.2q.2r.

More generally, an omnitruncated polyhedron is a bevel operator in Conway polyhedron notation.

== List of convex omnitruncated polyhedra ==
There are three convex forms. These forms can be seen as red faces of one regular polyhedron, yellow or green faces of the dual polyhedron, and blue faces at the truncated vertices of the quasiregular polyhedron.

Wythoff symbol p q r |	Omnitruncated polyhedron	Regular/quasiregular polyhedra
3 3 2 |	Truncated octahedron	Tetrahedron/Octahedron
4 3 2 |	Truncated cuboctahedron	Cube/Cuboctahedron/Octahedron
5 3 2 |	Truncated icosidodecahedron	Dodecahedron/Icosidodecahedron/Icosahedron

== List of nonconvex omnitruncated polyhedra ==
There are 5 nonconvex uniform omnitruncated polyhedra.

Wythoff symbol p q r |	Omnitruncated star polyhedron	Wythoff symbol p q r |	Omnitruncated star polyhedron
Right triangle domains (r=2)		General triangle domains	
3 4/3 2 |	Great truncated cuboctahedron	4 4/3 3 |	Cubitruncated cuboctahedron
3 5/3 2 |	Great truncated icosidodecahedron	5 5/3 3 |	Icositruncated dodecadodecahedron
5 5/3 2 |	Truncated dodecadodecahedron		

=== Other even-sided nonconvex polyhedra ===
There are 8 nonconvex forms with mixed Wythoff symbols p q (r s) |, and bow-tie shaped vertex figures, 2p.2q.-2q.-2p. They are not true omnitruncated polyhedra. Instead, the true omnitruncates p q r | or p q s | have coinciding 2r-gonal or 2s-gonal faces that must be removed respectively to form a proper polyhedron. All these polyhedra are one-sided, i.e. non-orientable. The p q r | degenerate Wythoff symbols are listed first, followed by the actual mixed Wythoff symbols.

Omnitruncated polyhedron	Image	Wythoff symbol
Cubohemioctahedron		3/2 2 3 | 2 3 (3/2 3/2) |
Small rhombihexahedron		3/2 2 4 | 2 4 (3/2 4/2) |
Great rhombihexahedron		4/3 3/2 2 | 2 4/3 (3/2 4/2) |
Small rhombidodecahedron		2 5/2 5 | 2 5 (3/2 5/2) |
Small dodecicosahedron		3/2 3 5 | 3 5 (3/2 5/4) |
Rhombicosahedron		2 5/2 3 | 2 3 (5/4 5/2) |
Great dodecicosahedron		5/2 5/3 3 | 3 5/3 (3/2 5/2) |
Great rhombidodecahedron		3/2 5/3 2 | 2 5/3 (3/2 5/4) |

== General omnitruncations (bevel) ==
Omnitruncations are also called cantitruncations or truncated rectifications (tr), and Conway's bevel (b) operator. When applied to nonregular polyhedra, new polyhedra can be generated, for example these 2-uniform polyhedra:

Coxeter	trrC	trrD	trtT	trtC	trtO	trtI
Conway	baO	baD	btT	btC	btO	btI
Image						

== See also ==
- Uniform polyhedron

Polyhedron operators
Seed	Truncation	Rectification	Bitruncation	Dual	Expansion	Omnitruncation	Alternations		
t_{0}{p,q} {p,q}	t_{01}{p,q} t{p,q}	t_{1}{p,q} r{p,q}	t_{12}{p,q} 2t{p,q}	t_{2}{p,q} 2r{p,q}	t_{02}{p,q} rr{p,q}	t_{012}{p,q} tr{p,q}	ht_{0}{p,q} h{q,p}	ht_{12}{p,q} s{q,p}	ht_{012}{p,q} sr{p,q}
