= Alternation (geometry) =

Removal of alternate vertices

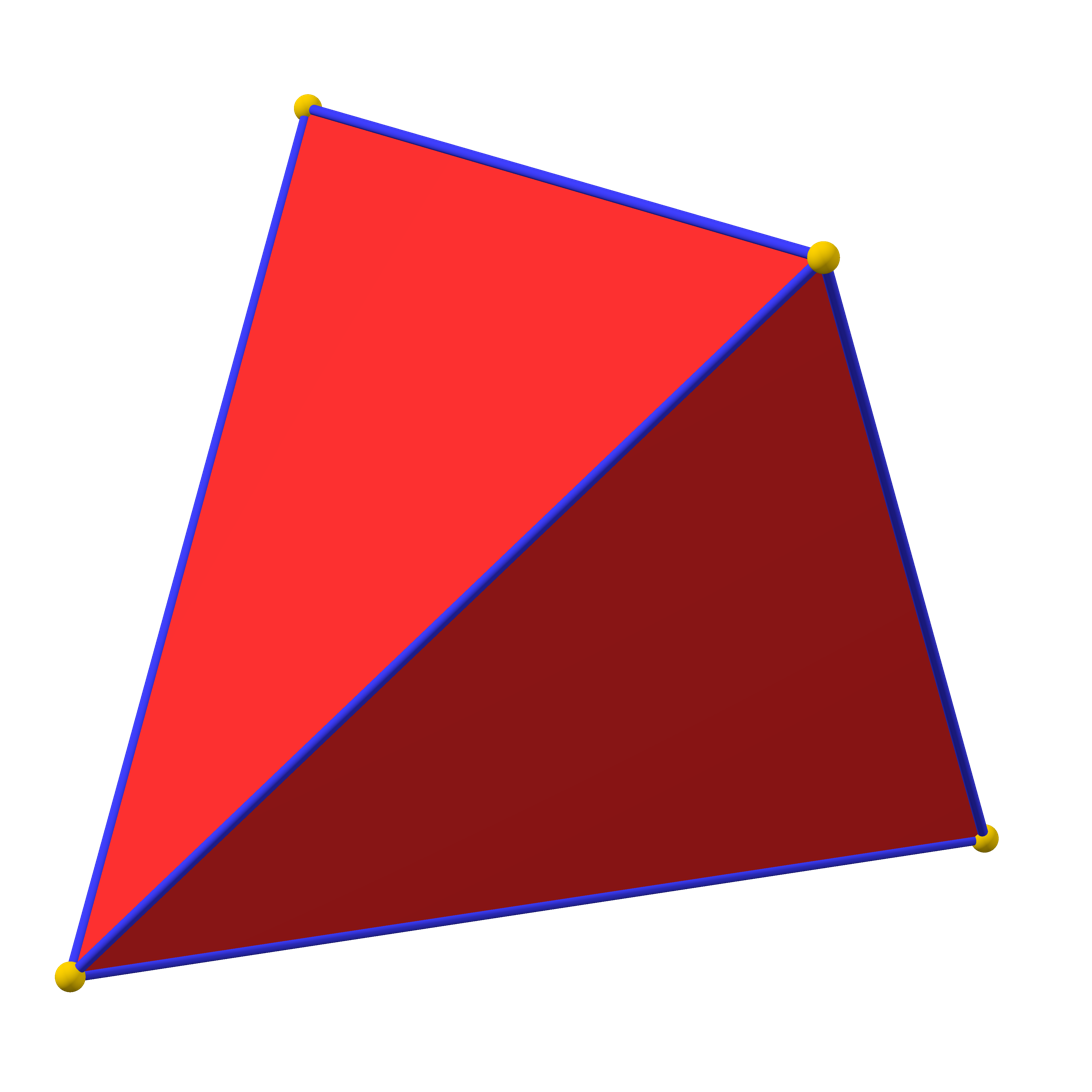
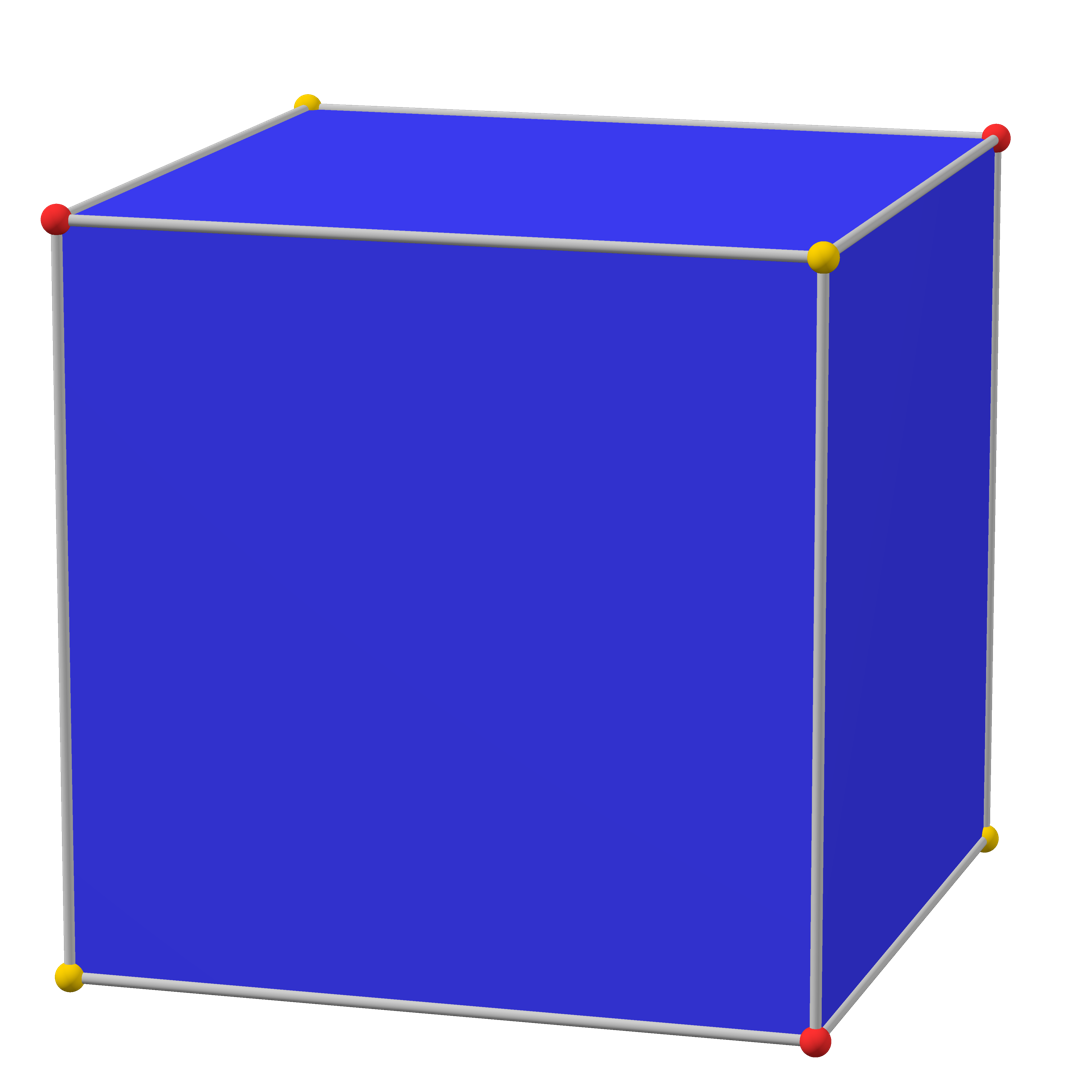
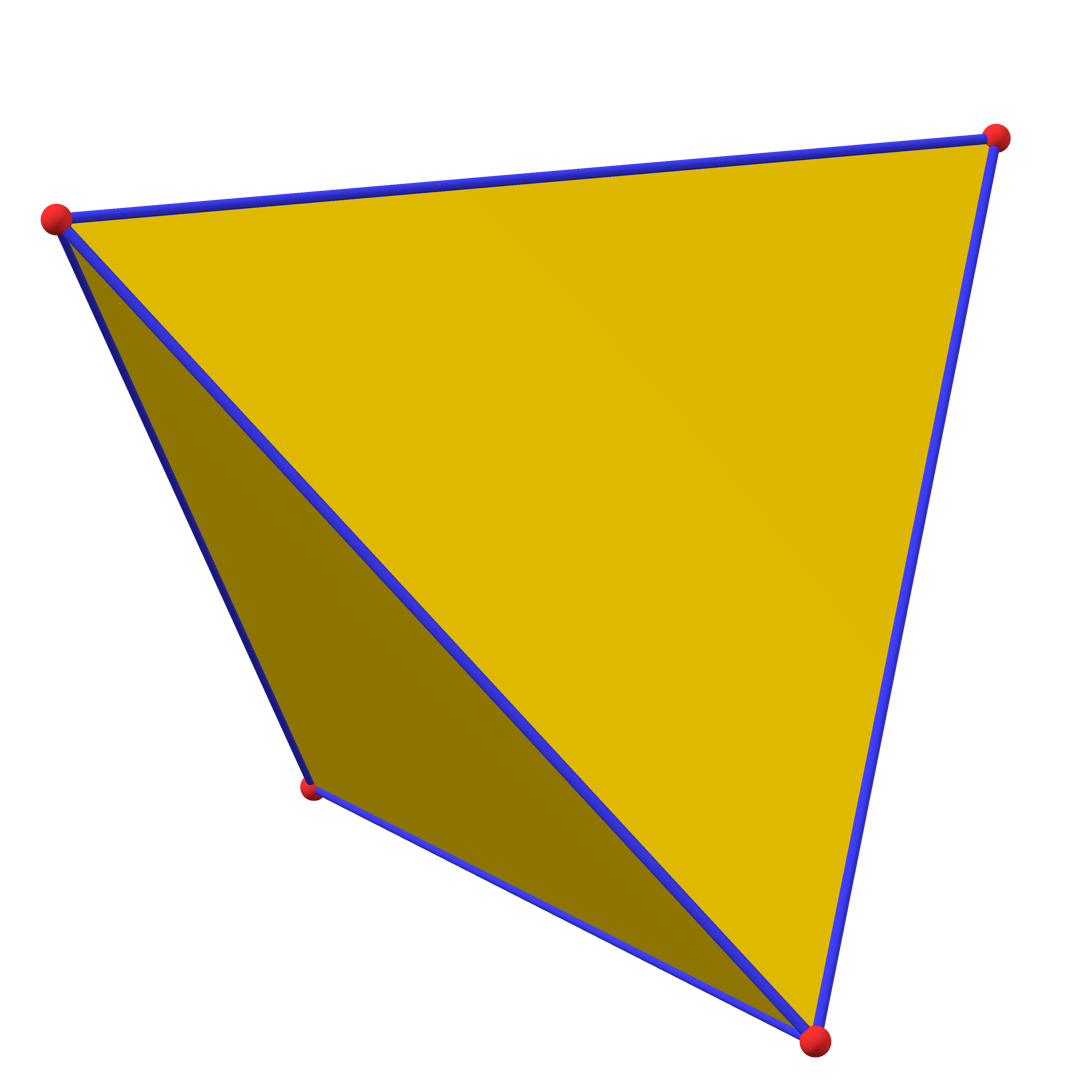
Alternation of a cube creates a tetrahedron.
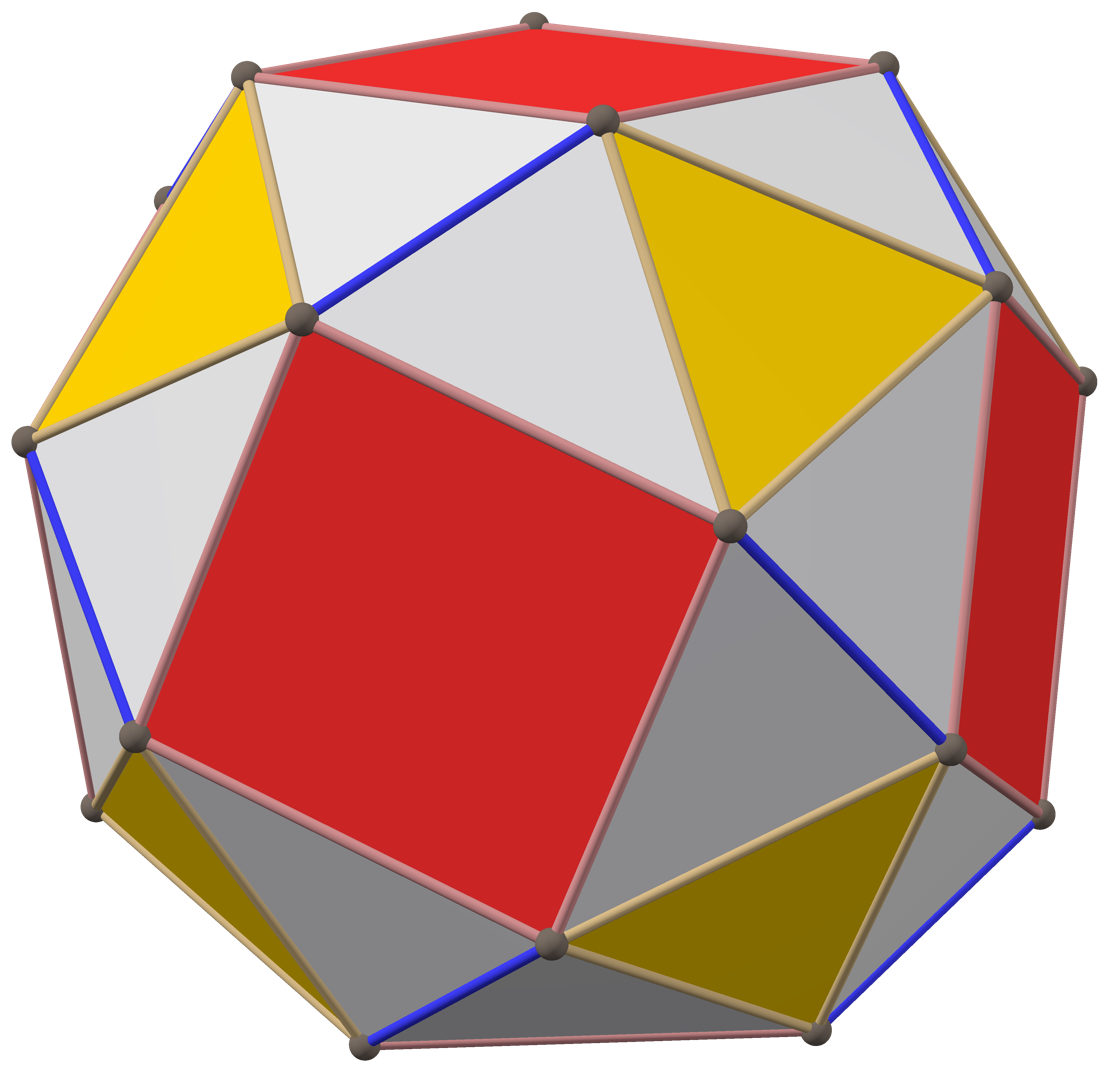
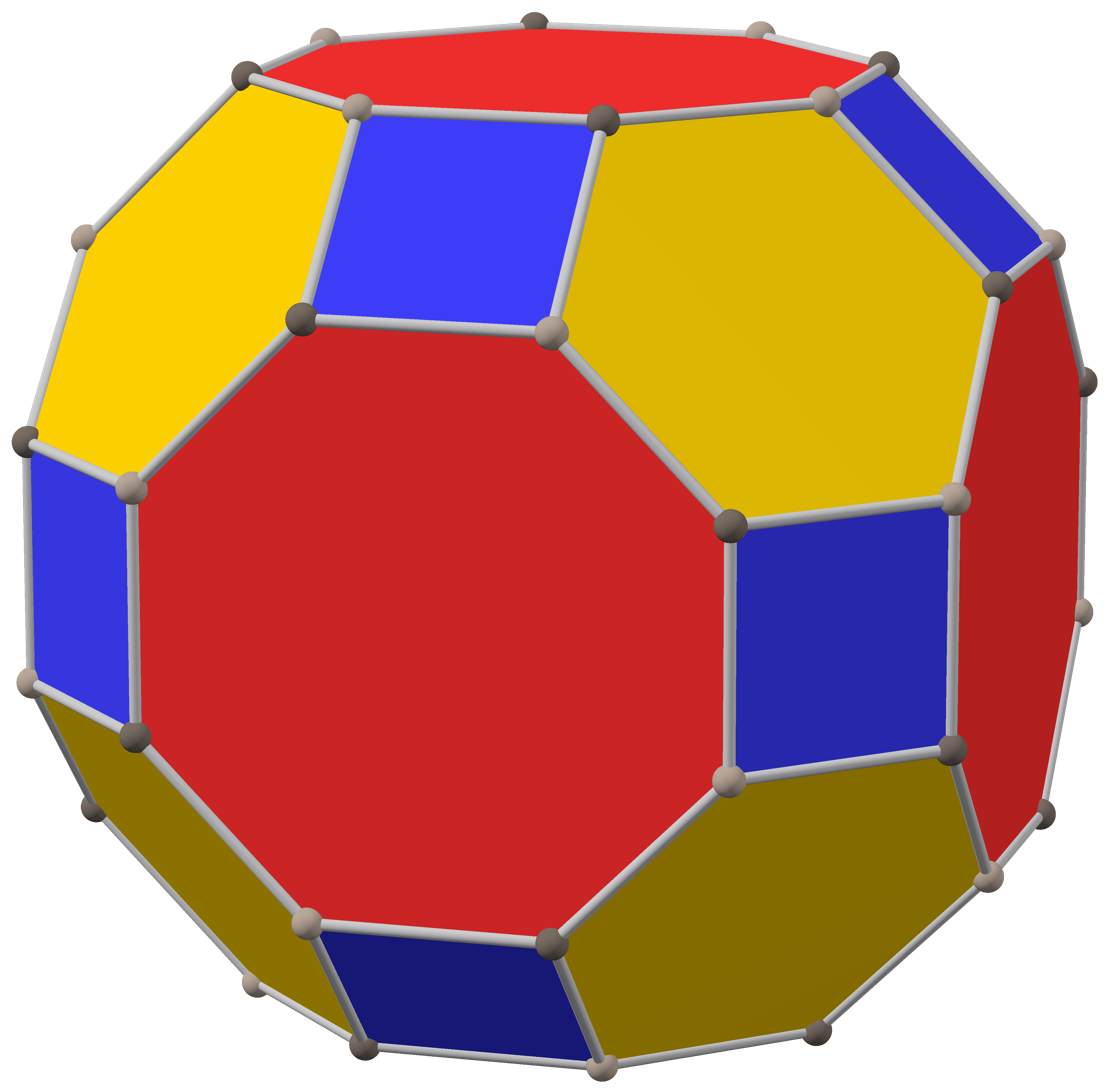
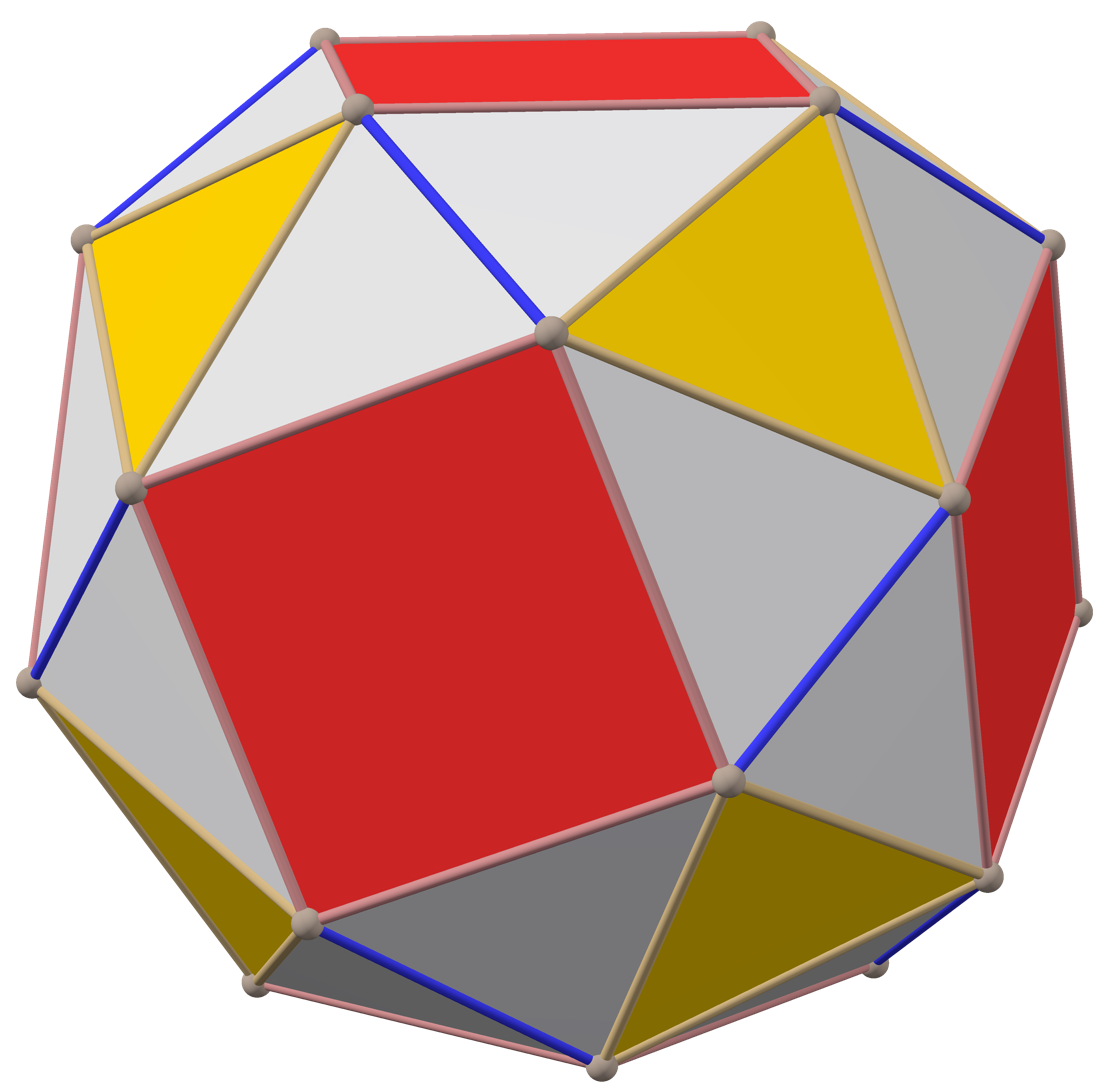
Alternation of a truncated cuboctahedron creates a nonuniform snub cube.

In geometry, an alternation or partial truncation is an operation on a polygon, polyhedron, tiling, or higher dimensional polytope that removes alternate vertices.

Coxeter labels an alternation by a prefixed h, standing for hemi or half. Because alternation reduces all polygon faces to half as many sides, it can only be applied to polytopes with all even-sided faces. An alternated square face becomes a digon, and being degenerate, is usually reduced to a single edge.

More generally any vertex-uniform polyhedron or tiling with a vertex configuration consisting of all even-numbered elements can be alternated. For example, the alternation of a vertex figure with 2a.2b.2c is a.3.b.3.c.3 where the three is the number of elements in this vertex figure. A special case is square faces whose order divides in half into degenerate digons. So for example, the cube 4.4.4 is alternated as 2.3.2.3.2.3 which is reduced to 3.3.3, being the tetrahedron, and all the 6 edges of the tetrahedra can also be seen as the degenerate faces of the original cube.

== Snub ==
A snub (in Coxeter's terminology) can be seen as an alternation of a truncated regular or truncated quasiregular polyhedron. In general a polyhedron can be snubbed if its truncation has only even-sided faces. All truncated rectified polyhedra can be snubbed, not just from regular polyhedra.

The snub square antiprism is an example of a general snub, and can be represented by ss{2,4}, with the square antiprism, s{2,4}.

== Alternated polytopes ==
This alternation operation applies to higher-dimensional polytopes and honeycombs as well, but in general most of the results of this operation will not be uniform. The voids created by the deleted vertices will not in general create uniform facets, and there are typically not enough degrees of freedom to allow an appropriate rescaling of the new edges. Exceptions do exist, however, such as the derivation of the snub 24-cell from the truncated 24-cell.

Examples:

- Honeycombs
  1. An alternated cubic honeycomb is the tetrahedral-octahedral honeycomb.
  2. An alternated hexagonal prismatic honeycomb is the gyrated alternated cubic honeycomb.
- 4-polytope
  1. An alternated truncated 24-cell is the snub 24-cell.
- 4-honeycombs:
  1. An alternated truncated 24-cell honeycomb is the snub 24-cell honeycomb.
- A hypercube can always be alternated into a uniform demihypercube.
  1. Cube → Tetrahedron (regular)
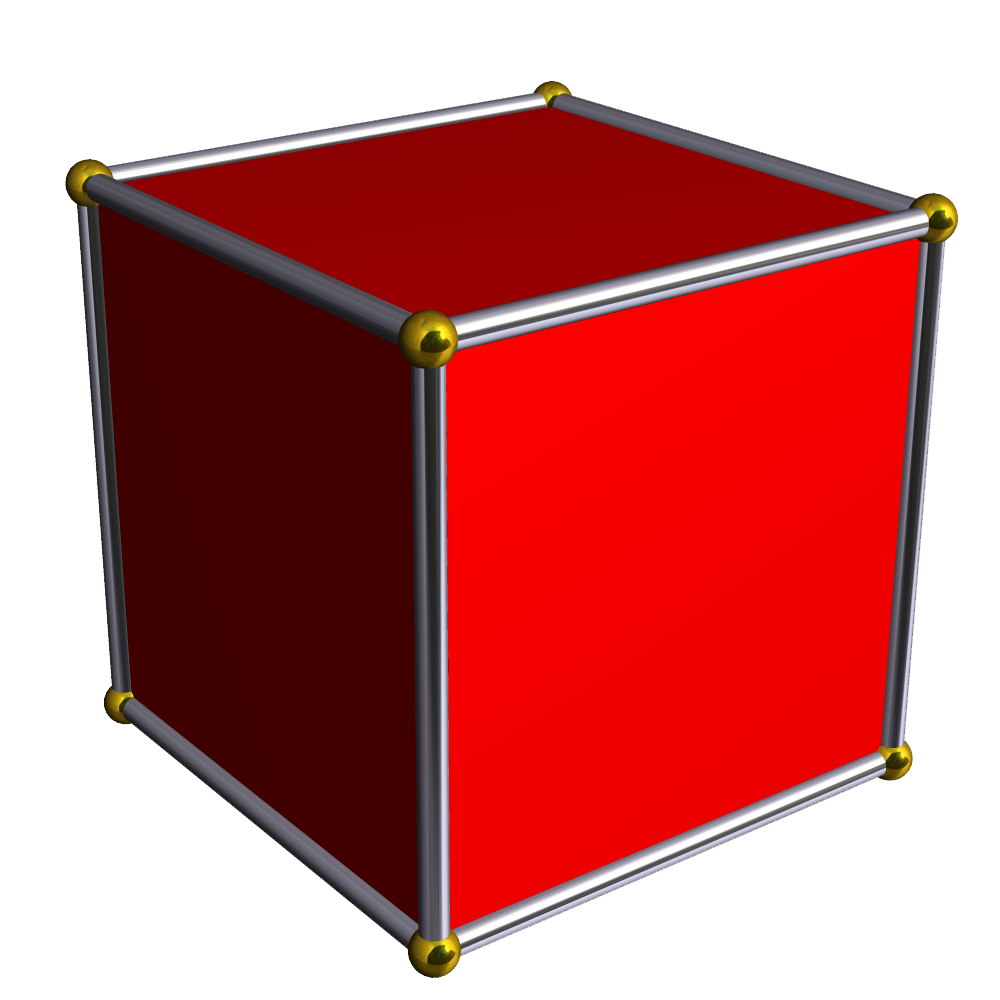
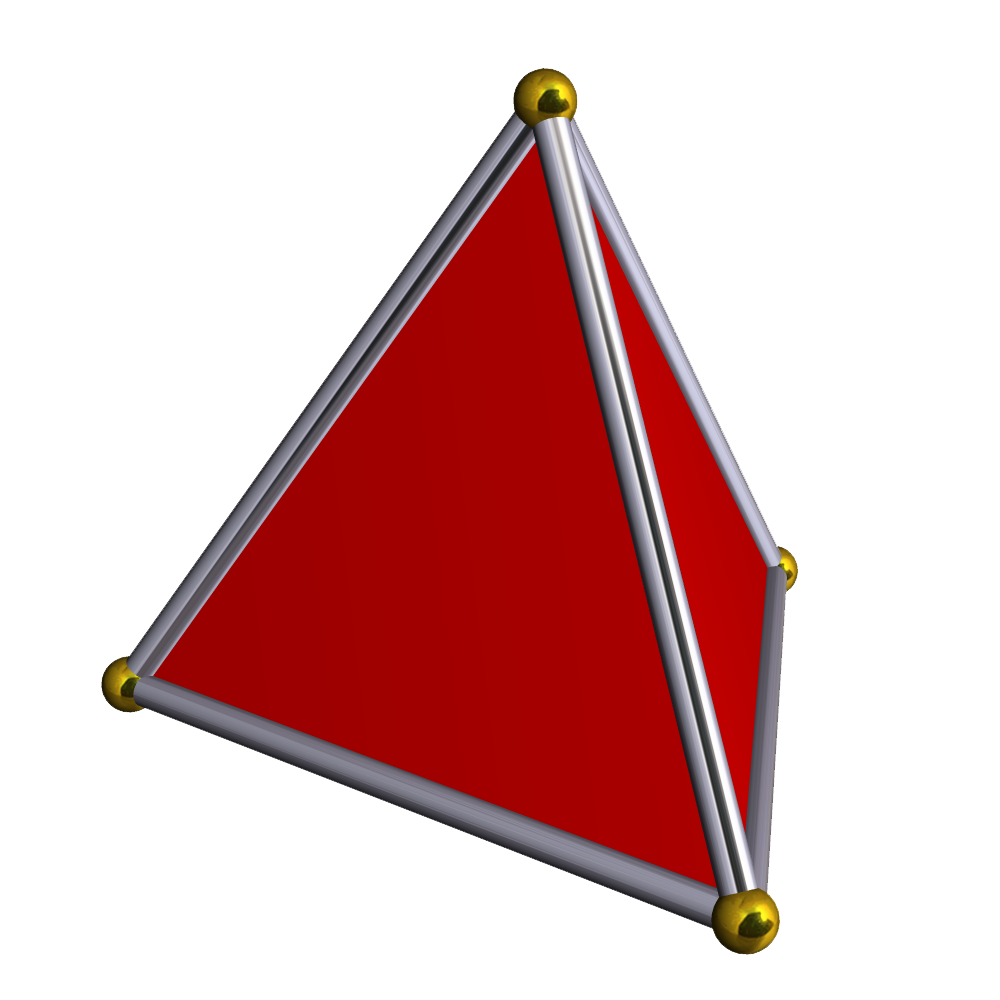
    - →
  2. Tesseract (8-cell) → 16-cell (regular)
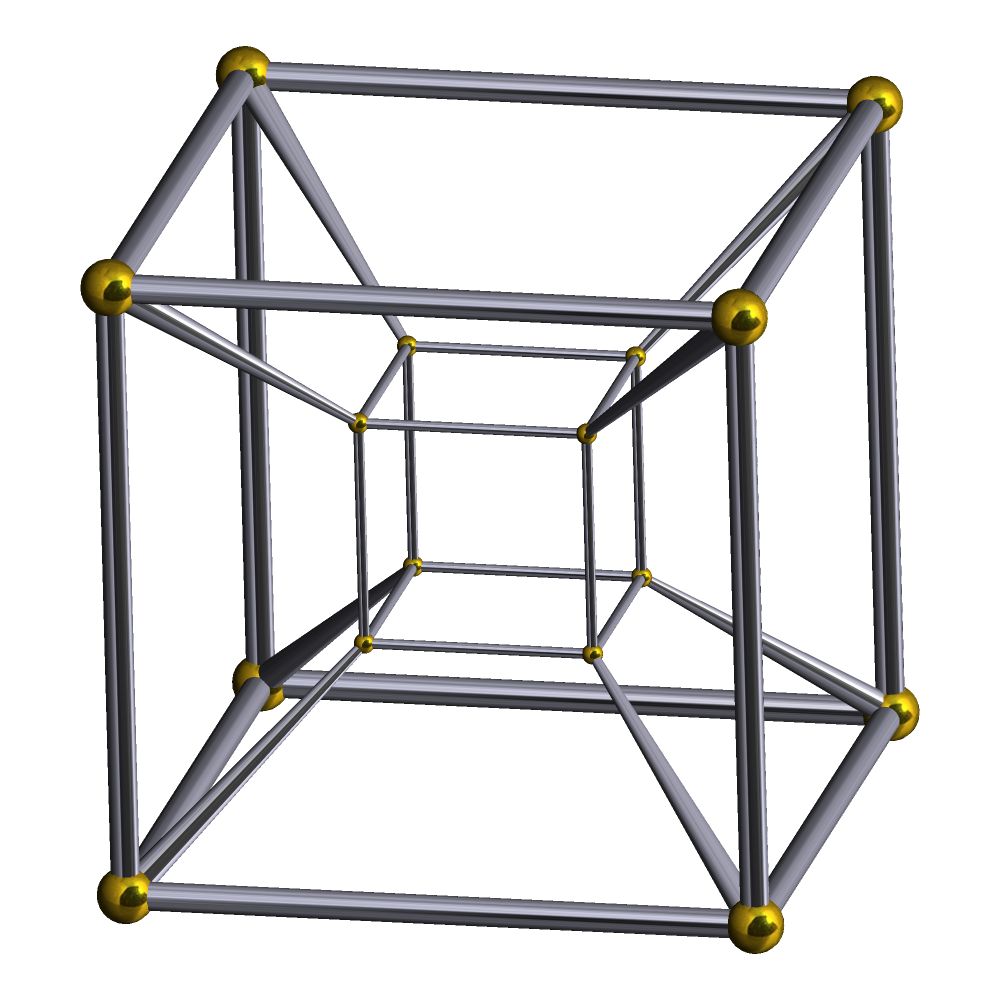
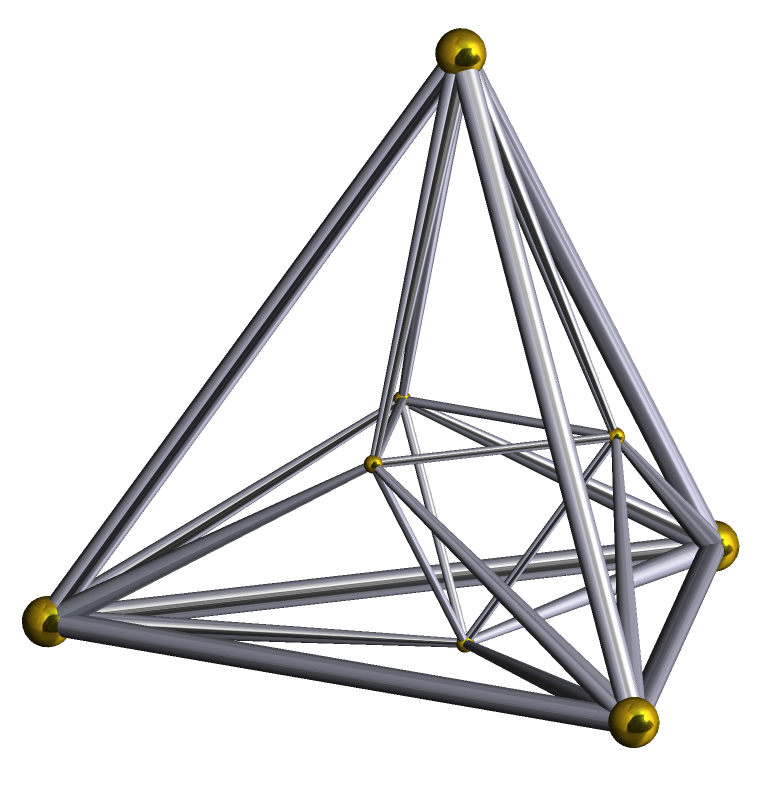
    - →
  3. Penteract → demipenteract (semiregular)
  4. Hexeract → demihexeract (uniform)
  5. ...

== Altered polyhedra ==
Coxeter also used the operator a, which contains both halves, so retains the original symmetry. For even-sided regular polyhedra, a{2p,q} represents a compound polyhedron with two opposite copies of h{2p,q}. For odd-sided, greater than 3, regular polyhedra a{p,q}, becomes a star polyhedron.

Norman Johnson extended the use of the altered operator a{p,q}, b{p,q} for blended, and c{p,q} for converted, as,, and respectively.

The compound polyhedron known as the stellated octahedron can be represented by a{4,3} (an altered cube), and,.

The star polyhedron known as the small ditrigonal icosidodecahedron can be represented by a{5,3} (an altered dodecahedron), and,. Here all the pentagons have been alternated into pentagrams, and triangles have been inserted to take up the resulting free edges.

The star polyhedron known as the great ditrigonal icosidodecahedron can be represented by a{5/2,3} (an altered great stellated dodecahedron), and,. Here all the pentagrams have been alternated back into pentagons, and triangles have been inserted to take up the resulting free edges.

== Alternate truncations ==
A similar operation can truncate alternate vertices, rather than just removing them. Below is a set of polyhedra that can be generated from the Catalan solids. These have two types of vertices which can be alternately truncated. Truncating the "higher order" vertices and both vertex types produce these forms:

Name	Original	Alternated truncation	Truncation	Truncated name
Cube; Dual of rectified tetrahedron				Alternate truncated cube
Rhombic dodecahedron Dual of cuboctahedron				Truncated rhombic dodecahedron
Rhombic triacontahedron Dual of icosidodecahedron				Truncated rhombic triacontahedron
Triakis tetrahedron Dual of truncated tetrahedron				Truncated triakis tetrahedron
Triakis octahedron Dual of truncated cube				Truncated triakis octahedron
Triakis icosahedron Dual of truncated dodecahedron				Truncated triakis icosahedron

== See also ==
- Conway polyhedral notation
- Rectification (geometry)
- Truncation (geometry)
- Uniform 4-polytope
- Uniform polyhedron
- Wythoff construction

Polyhedron operators
Seed	Truncation	Rectification	Bitruncation	Dual	Expansion	Omnitruncation	Alternations		
t_{0}{p,q} {p,q}	t_{01}{p,q} t{p,q}	t_{1}{p,q} r{p,q}	t_{12}{p,q} 2t{p,q}	t_{2}{p,q} 2r{p,q}	t_{02}{p,q} rr{p,q}	t_{012}{p,q} tr{p,q}	ht_{0}{p,q} h{q,p}	ht_{12}{p,q} s{q,p}	ht_{012}{p,q} sr{p,q}
