= Bitruncation =

Operation in Euclidean geometry

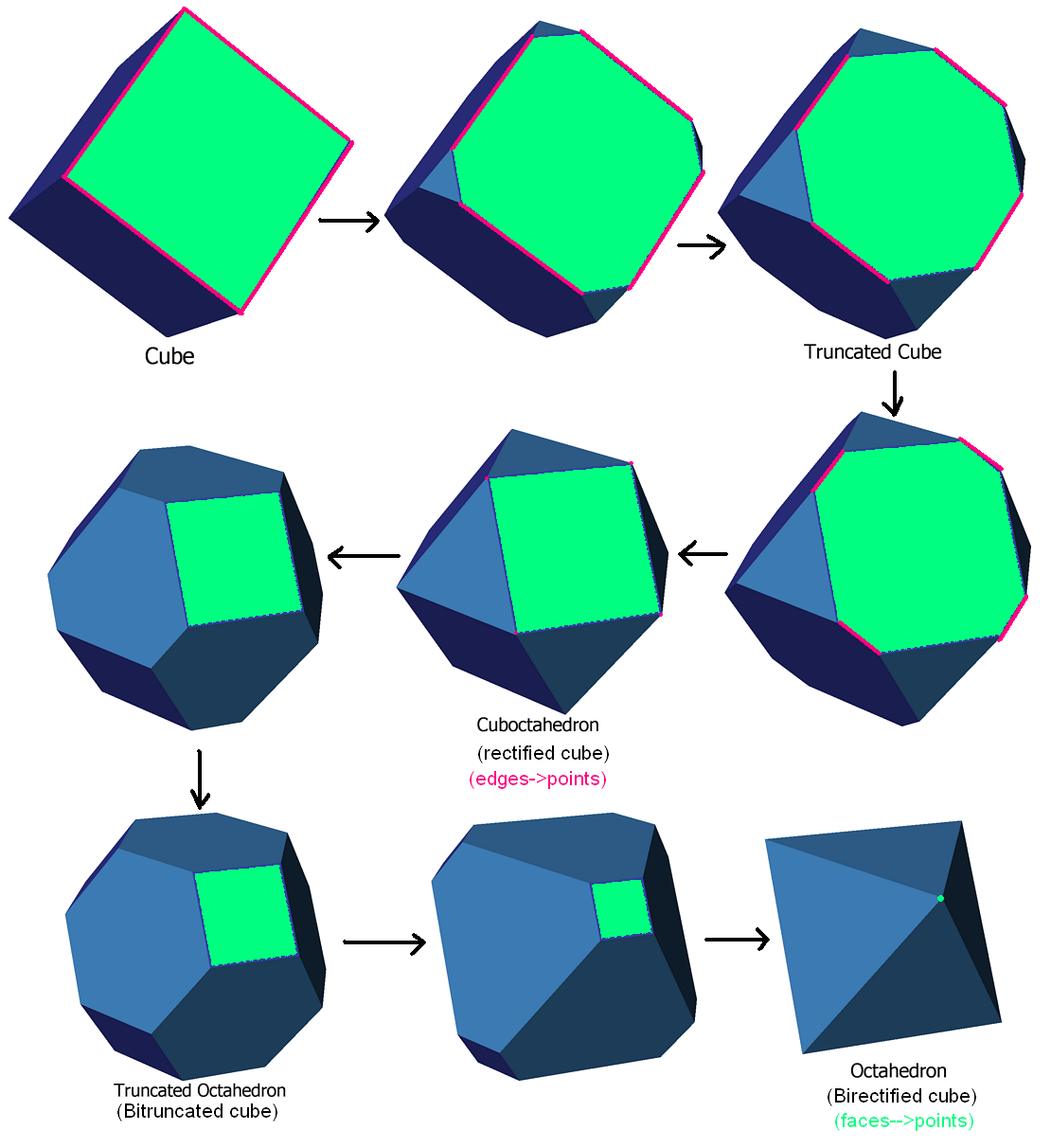
A bitruncated cube is a truncated octahedron.

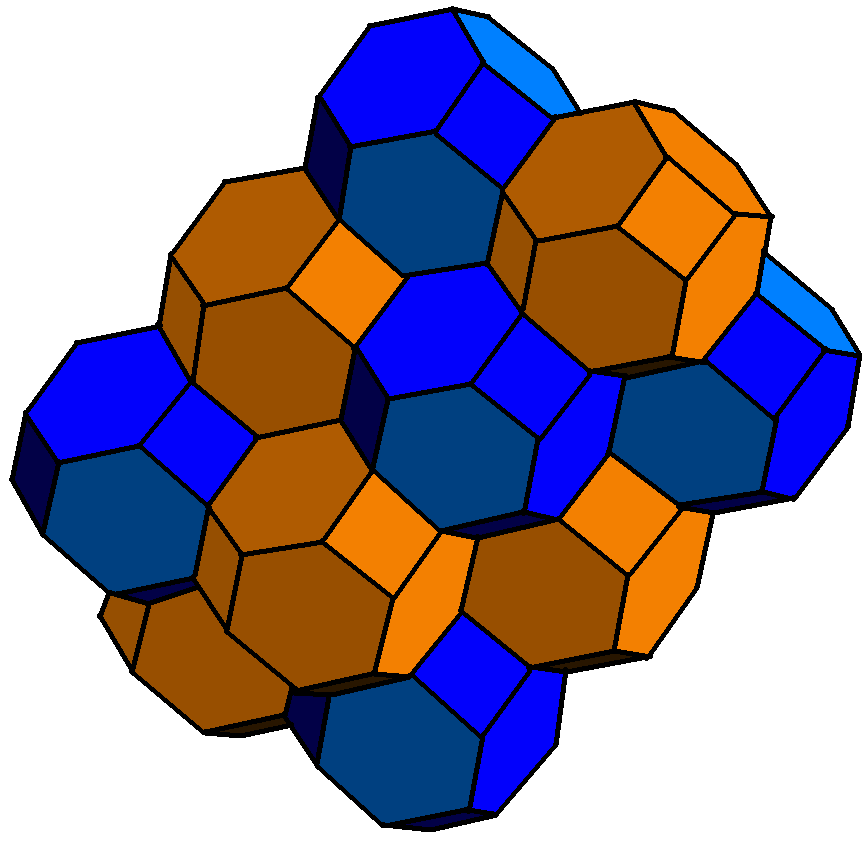
A bitruncated cubic honeycomb - Cubic cells become orange truncated octahedra, and vertices are replaced by blue truncated octahedra.

In geometry, a bitruncation is an operation on regular polytopes. The original edges are lost completely and the original faces remain as smaller copies of themselves.

Bitruncated regular polytopes can be represented by an extended Schläfli symbol notation t_{1,2}{p,q,...} or 2t{p,q,...}.

== In regular polyhedra and tilings ==
For regular polyhedra (i.e. regular 3-polytopes), a bitruncated form is the truncated dual. For example, a bitruncated cube is a truncated octahedron.

== In regular 4-polytopes and honeycombs ==
For a regular 4-polytope, a bitruncated form is a dual-symmetric operator. A bitruncated 4-polytope is the same as the bitruncated dual, and will have double the symmetry if the original 4-polytope is self-dual.

A regular polytope (or honeycomb) {p, q, r} will have its {p, q} cells bitruncated into truncated {q, p} cells, and the vertices are replaced by truncated {q, r} cells.

=== Self-dual {p,q,p} 4-polytope/honeycombs ===
An interesting result of this operation is that self-dual 4-polytope {p,q,p} (and honeycombs) remain cell-transitive after bitruncation. There are 5 such forms corresponding to the five truncated regular polyhedra: t{q,p}. Two are honeycombs on the 3-sphere, one a honeycomb in Euclidean 3-space, and two are honeycombs in hyperbolic 3-space.

Space	4-polytope or honeycomb	Schläfli symbol Coxeter-Dynkin diagram	Cell type	Cell image	Vertex figure
$\mathbb{S}^3$	Bitruncated 5-cell (10-cell) (Uniform 4-polytope)	t_{1,2}{3,3,3}	truncated tetrahedron		
$\mathbb{S}^3$	Bitruncated 24-cell (48-cell) (Uniform 4-polytope)	t_{1,2}{3,4,3}	truncated cube		
$\mathbb{E}^3$	Bitruncated cubic honeycomb (Uniform Euclidean convex honeycomb)	t_{1,2}{4,3,4}	truncated octahedron		
$\mathbb{H}^3$	Bitruncated icosahedral honeycomb (Uniform hyperbolic convex honeycomb)	t_{1,2}{3,5,3}	truncated dodecahedron		
$\mathbb{H}^3$	Bitruncated order-5 dodecahedral honeycomb (Uniform hyperbolic convex honeycomb)	t_{1,2}{5,3,5}	truncated icosahedron		

== See also ==
- Rectification (geometry)
- Truncation (geometry)
- Uniform 4-polytope
- Uniform polyhedron

Polyhedron operators
Seed	Truncation	Rectification	Bitruncation	Dual	Expansion	Omnitruncation	Alternations		
t_{0}{p,q} {p,q}	t_{01}{p,q} t{p,q}	t_{1}{p,q} r{p,q}	t_{12}{p,q} 2t{p,q}	t_{2}{p,q} 2r{p,q}	t_{02}{p,q} rr{p,q}	t_{012}{p,q} tr{p,q}	ht_{0}{p,q} h{q,p}	ht_{12}{p,q} s{q,p}	ht_{012}{p,q} sr{p,q}
