= Omnitruncation =

Geometric operation

In geometry, an omnitruncation of a convex polytope is a simple polytope of the same dimension, having a vertex for each flag of the original polytope and a facet for each face of any dimension of the original polytope. Omnitruncation is the dual operation to barycentric subdivision. Because the barycentric subdivision of any polytope can be realized as another polytope, the same is true for the omnitruncation of any polytope.

When omnitruncation is applied to a regular polytope (or honeycomb) it can be described geometrically as a Wythoff construction that creates a maximum number of facets. It is represented in a Coxeter–Dynkin diagram with all nodes ringed.

Omnitruncation of a regular tetrahedron into a truncated octahedron. Half of the truncated octahedron's hexagonal faces come from the tetrahedron's triangular faces getting truncated, and half come from the degree-3 vertices getting cantitruncated.
Omnitruncation of a cube (left) and a regular octahedron (right) into a truncated cuboctahedron
Omnitruncation of a regular dodecahedron (left) and a regular icosahedron (right) into a truncated icosidodecahedron

It is a shortcut term which has a different meaning in progressively-higher-dimensional polytopes:

- Uniform polytope truncation operators
  - For regular polygons: An ordinary truncation, $t_{0,1}\{ p \} = t\{ p\} = \{ 2p\}$.
    - Coxeter-Dynkin diagram
  - For uniform polyhedra (3-polytopes): A cantitruncation, $t_{0,1,2}\{ p,q \} = tr\{ p,q\}$. (Application of both cantellation and truncation operations)
    - Coxeter-Dynkin diagram:
  - For uniform polychora: A runcicantitruncation, $t_{0,1,2,3}\{ p,q,r \}$. (Application of runcination, cantellation, and truncation operations)
    - Coxeter-Dynkin diagram:,,
  - For uniform polytera (5-polytopes): A steriruncicantitruncation, t_{0,1,2,3,4}{p,q,r,s}. $t_{0,1,2,3,4}\{ p,q,r,s \}$. (Application of sterication, runcination, cantellation, and truncation operations)
    - Coxeter-Dynkin diagram:,,
  - For uniform n-polytopes: $t_{0,1,...,n-1}\{ p_1, p_2,...,p_n \}$.

== See also ==
- Expansion (geometry)
- Omnitruncated polyhedron

Polyhedron operators
Seed	Truncation	Rectification	Bitruncation	Dual	Expansion	Omnitruncation	Alternations		
t_{0}{p,q} {p,q}	t_{01}{p,q} t{p,q}	t_{1}{p,q} r{p,q}	t_{12}{p,q} 2t{p,q}	t_{2}{p,q} 2r{p,q}	t_{02}{p,q} rr{p,q}	t_{012}{p,q} tr{p,q}	ht_{0}{p,q} h{q,p}	ht_{12}{p,q} s{q,p}	ht_{012}{p,q} sr{p,q}
