= Expansion (geometry) =

Geometric operation on convex polytopes

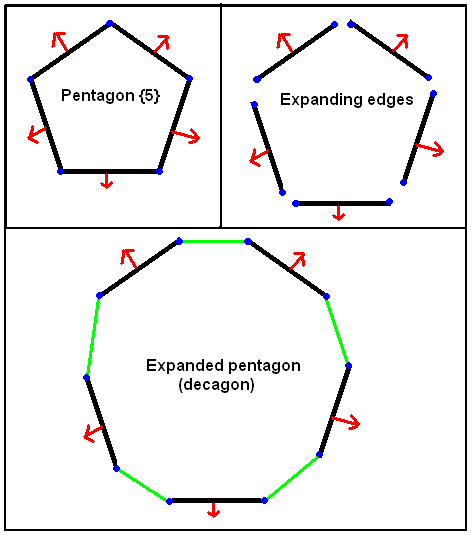
An example of expanding pentagon into a decagon by moving edges away from the center and inserting new edges in the gaps. The expansion is uniform if all the edges are the same length.

Animation showing an expanded cube (and octahedron)

In geometry, expansion is a polytope operation where facets are separated and moved radially apart, and new facets are formed at separated elements (vertices, edges, etc.). Equivalently this operation can be imagined by keeping facets in the same position but reducing their size.

The expansion of a regular convex polytope creates a uniform convex polytope.

For polyhedra, an expanded polyhedron has all the faces of the original polyhedron, all the faces of the dual polyhedron, and new square faces in place of the original edges.

== Expansion of regular polytopes ==
According to Coxeter, this multidimensional term was defined by Alicia Boole Stott for creating new polytopes, specifically starting from regular polytopes to construct new uniform polytopes.

The expansion operation is symmetric with respect to a regular polytope and its dual. The resulting figure contains the facets of both the regular and its dual, along with various prismatic facets filling the gaps created between intermediate dimensional elements.

It has somewhat different meanings by dimension. In a Wythoff construction, an expansion is generated by reflections from the first and last mirrors. In higher dimensions, lower dimensional expansions can be written with a subscript, so e_{2} is the same as t_{0,2} in any dimension.

By dimension:

- A regular {p} polygon expands into a regular 2n-gon.
  - The operation is identical to truncation for polygons, e{p} = e_{1}{p} = t_{0,1}{p} = t{p} and has Coxeter-Dynkin diagram.
- A regular {p,q} polyhedron (3-polytope) expands into a polyhedron with vertex configuration p.4.q.4.
  - This operation for polyhedra is also called cantellation, e{p,q} = e_{2}{p,q} = t_{0,2}{p,q} = rr{p,q}, and has Coxeter diagram.
    For example, a rhombicuboctahedron can be called an expanded cube, expanded octahedron, as well as a cantellated cube or cantellated octahedron.
- A regular {p,q,r} 4-polytope (4-polytope) expands into a new 4-polytope with the original {p,q} cells, new cells {r,q} in place of the old vertices, p-gonal prisms in place of the old faces, and r-gonal prisms in place of the old edges.
  - This operation for 4-polytopes is also called runcination, e{p,q,r} = e_{3}{p,q,r} = t_{0,3}{p,q,r}, and has Coxeter diagram.
- Similarly a regular {p,q,r,s} 5-polytope expands into a new 5-polytope with facets {p,q,r}, {s,r,q}, {p,q}×{ } prisms, {s,r}×{ } prisms, and {p}×{s} duoprisms.
  - This operation is called sterication, e{p,q,r,s} = e_{4}{p,q,r,s} = t_{0,4}{p,q,r,s} = 2r2r{p,q,r,s} and has Coxeter diagram.

The general operator for expansion of a regular n-polytope is t_{0,n−1}{p,q,r,...}. New regular facets are added at each vertex, and new prismatic polytopes are added at each divided edge, face, ... ridge, etc.

== See also ==
- Conway polyhedron notation

== Notes ==
Polyhedron operators
Seed	Truncation	Rectification	Bitruncation	Dual	Expansion	Omnitruncation	Alternations		
t_{0}{p,q} {p,q}	t_{01}{p,q} t{p,q}	t_{1}{p,q} r{p,q}	t_{12}{p,q} 2t{p,q}	t_{2}{p,q} 2r{p,q}	t_{02}{p,q} rr{p,q}	t_{012}{p,q} tr{p,q}	ht_{0}{p,q} h{q,p}	ht_{12}{p,q} s{q,p}	ht_{012}{p,q} sr{p,q}
