= Cantellation (geometry) =

Geometric operation on a regular polytope

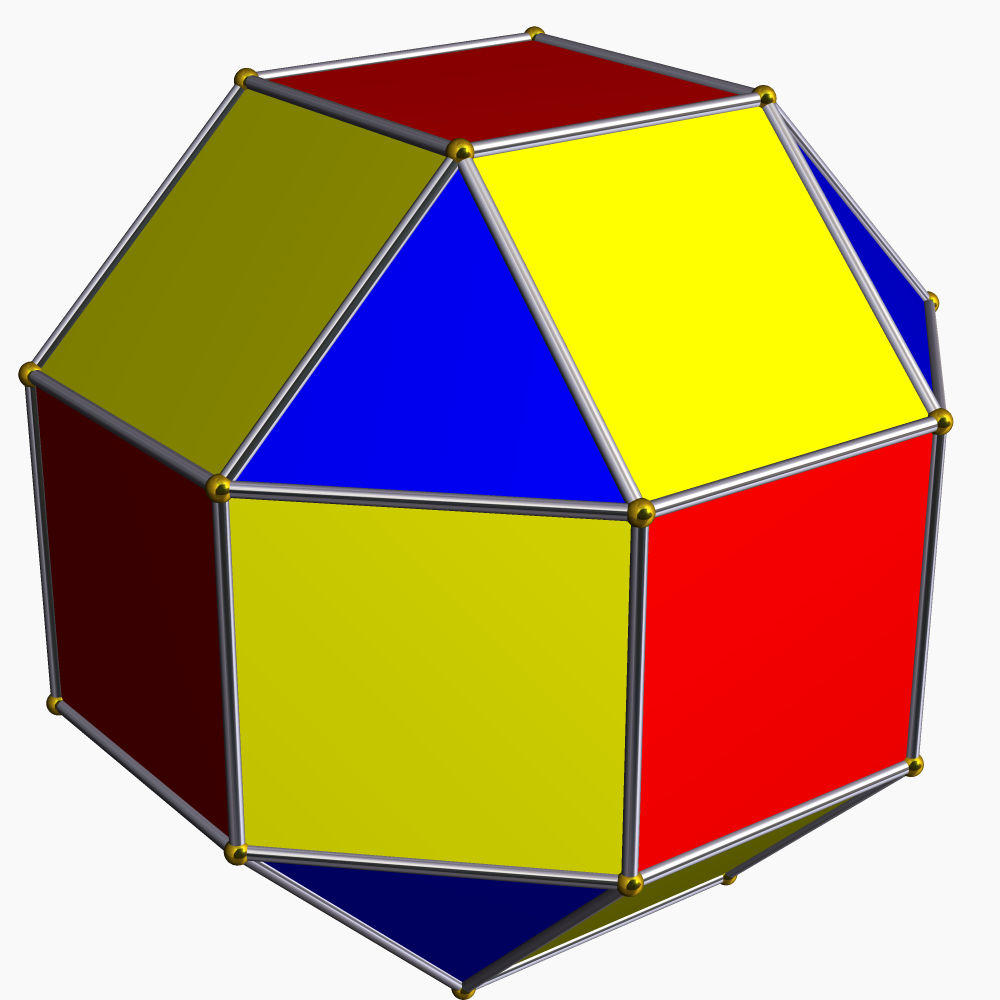
A cantellated cube - Red faces are reduced. Edges are bevelled, forming new yellow square faces. Vertices are truncated, forming new blue triangle faces.

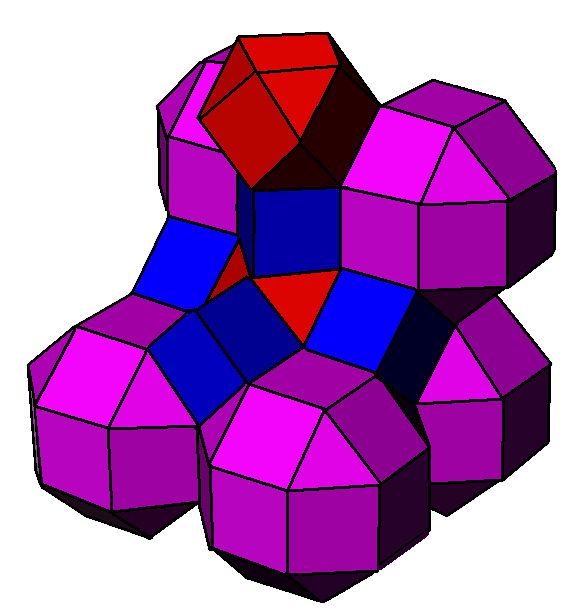
A cantellated cubic honeycomb - Purple cubes are cantellated. Edges are bevelled, forming new blue cubic cells. Vertices are truncated, forming new red rectified cube cells.

In geometry, a cantellation is a 2nd-order truncation in any dimension that bevels a regular polytope at its edges and at its vertices, creating a new facet in place of each edge and of each vertex. Cantellation also applies to regular tilings and honeycombs. Cantellating a polyhedron is also rectifying its rectification.

Cantellation (for polyhedra and tilings) is also called expansion by Alicia Boole Stott: it corresponds to moving the faces of the regular form away from the center, and filling in a new face in the gap for each opened edge and for each opened vertex.

== Notation ==
A cantellated polytope is represented by an extended Schläfli symbol t_{0,2}{p,q,...} or r$\begin{Bmatrix}p\\q\\...\end{Bmatrix}$ or rr{p,q,...}.

For polyhedra, a cantellation offers a direct sequence from a regular polyhedron to its dual.

Example: cantellation sequence between cube and octahedron:

Example: a cuboctahedron is a cantellated tetrahedron.

For higher-dimensional polytopes, a cantellation offers a direct sequence from a regular polytope to its birectified form.

== Examples: cantellating polyhedra, tilings ==
Regular polyhedra, regular tilings
| Form | Polyhedra | | | Tilings | |
| Coxeter | rTT | rCO | rID | rQQ | rHΔ |
| Conway notation | eT | eC = eO | eI = eD | eQ | eH = eΔ |
|---|---|---|---|---|---|
| Polyhedra to be expanded | Tetrahedron | Cube or octahedron | Icosahedron or dodecahedron | Square tiling | Hexagonal tiling Triangular tiling |
| Image | | | | | |
| Animation | | | | | |

Uniform polyhedra or their duals
| Coxeter | rrt{2,3} | rrs{2,6} | rrCO | rrID |
| Conway notation | eP3 | eA4 | eaO = eaC | eaI = eaD |
|---|---|---|---|---|
| Polyhedra to be expanded | Triangular prism or triangular bipyramid | Square antiprism or tetragonal trapezohedron | Cuboctahedron or rhombic dodecahedron | Icosidodecahedron or rhombic triacontahedron |
| Image | | | | |
| Animation | | | | |

== See also ==
- Chamfer (geometry)
- Conway polyhedron notation
- Uniform 4-polytope
- Uniform polyhedron
