= List of mathematical shapes =

Following is a list of shapes studied in mathematics.

== Algebraic curves ==
- Cubic plane curve
- Quartic plane curve
- Fractal

=== Rational curves ===
==== Degree 2 ====
- Conic sections
- Unit circle
- Unit hyperbola

==== Degree 3 ====
- Folium of Descartes
- Cissoid of Diocles
- Conchoid of de Sluze
- Right strophoid
- Semicubical parabola
- Serpentine curve
- Trident curve
- Trisectrix of Maclaurin
- Tschirnhausen cubic
- Witch of Agnesi

==== Degree 4 ====
- Ampersand curve
- Bean curve
- Bicorn
- Bow curve
- Bullet-nose curve
- Cruciform curve
- Deltoid curve
- Devil's curve
- Hippopede
- Kampyle of Eudoxus
- Kappa curve
- Lemniscate of Booth
- Lemniscate of Gerono
- Lemniscate of Bernoulli
- Limaçon
  - Cardioid
  - Limaçon trisectrix
- Trifolium curve

==== Degree 5 ====
- Quintic of l'Hospital

==== Degree 6 ====
- Astroid
- Atriphtaloid
- Nephroid
- Quadrifolium

==== Families of variable degree ====
- Epicycloid
- Epispiral
- Epitrochoid
- Hypocycloid
- Lissajous curve
- Poinsot's spirals
- Rational normal curve
- Rose curve

=== Curves of genus one ===
- Bicuspid curve
- Cassini oval
- Cassinoide
- Cubic curve
- Elliptic curve
- Watt's curve

=== Curves with genus greater than one ===
- Butterfly curve
- Elkies trinomial curves
- Hyperelliptic curve
- Klein quartic
- Classical modular curve
- Bolza surface
- Macbeath surface

=== Curve families with variable genus ===
- Polynomial lemniscate
- Fermat curve
- Sinusoidal spiral
- Superellipse
- Hurwitz surface

== Transcendental curves ==
- Bowditch curve (aka Lissajous curve)
- Brachistochrone
- Butterfly curve
- Catenary
- Clélies
- Cochleoid
- Cycloid
- Horopter
- Isochrone
  - Isochrone of Huygens (Tautochrone)
  - Isochrone of Leibniz
  - Isochrone of Varignon
- Lamé curve
- Pursuit curve
- Rhumb line
- Spirals
  - Archimedean spiral
  - Cornu spiral
  - Cotes' spiral
  - Fermat's spiral
  - Galileo's spiral
  - Hyperbolic spiral
  - Lituus
  - Logarithmic spiral
  - Nielsen's spiral
  - Golden spiral
- Syntractrix
- Tractrix
- Trochoid

== Piecewise constructions ==
- Bézier curve
- Splines
  - B-spline
  - Nonuniform rational B-spline
- Ogee
- Loess curve
- Lowess
- Polygonal curve
  - Maurer rose
- Reuleaux polygon
  - Reuleaux triangle
  - Reuleaux pentagon
  - Reuleaux heptagon
- Bézier triangle

== Curves generated by other curves ==
- Caustic including Catacaustic and Diacaustic
- Cissoid
- Conchoid
- Evolute
- Glissette
- Inverse curve
- Involute
- Isoptic including Orthoptic
- Orthotomic
- Negative pedal curve
- Pedal curve
- Parallel curve
- Radial curve
- Roulette
- Strophoid

== Space curves ==
- Conchospiral
- Helix
  - Tendril perversion (a transition between back-to-back helices)
  - Hemihelix, a quasi-helical shape characterized by multiple tendril perversions
- Seiffert's spiral
- Slinky spiral
- Twisted cubic
- Viviani's curve

== Surfaces in 3-space ==
- Plane
- Quadric surfaces
  - Cone
  - Cylinder
  - Ellipsoid
    - Spheroid
      - Sphere
  - Hyperboloid
  - Paraboloid
- Bicylinder
- Tricylinder
- Möbius strip
- Torus
- Reuleaux polyhedra
  - Reuleaux tetrahedron
  - Reuleaux dodecahedron

== Minimal surfaces ==
- Catalan's minimal surface
- Costa's minimal surface
- Catenoid
- Enneper surface
- Gyroid
- Helicoid
- Lidinoid
- Riemann's minimal surface
- Saddle tower
- Scherk surface
- Schwarz minimal surface
- Triply periodic minimal surface

== Non-orientable surfaces ==
- Klein bottle
- Real projective plane
  - Cross-cap
  - Roman surface
  - Boy's surface

== Quadrics ==
- Sphere
- Spheroid
  - Oblate spheroid
- Cone
- Ellipsoid
- Hyperboloid of one sheet
- Hyperboloid of two sheets
- Hyperbolic paraboloid (a ruled surface)
- Paraboloid
- Sphericon
- Oloid

== Pseudospherical surfaces ==
- Dini's surface
- Pseudosphere

== Algebraic surfaces ==
See the list of algebraic surfaces.

- Cayley cubic
- Barth sextic
- Clebsch cubic
- Monkey saddle (saddle-like surface for 3 legs.)
- Torus
- Dupin cyclide (inversion of a torus)
- Whitney umbrella

== Miscellaneous surfaces ==
- Right conoid (a ruled surface)

== Fractals ==
- Apollonian gasket
- Apollonian sphere packing
- Blancmange curve
- Cantor dust
- Cantor set
- Cantor tesseract
- Circle inversion fractal
- De Rham curve
- Douady rabbit
- Dragon curve
- Fibonacci word fractal
- Flame fractal
- Fractal curve
- Gosper curve
- Gosper island
- H-fractal
- Hénon map
- Hexaflake
- Hilbert curve
- Ikeda map attractor
- Iterated function system
- Jerusalem cube
- Julia set
- Koch curve
- Koch snowflake
- L-system
- Lévy C curve
- Feigenbaum attractor
- Lorenz attractor
- Lyapunov fractal
- Mandelbrot set
- Mandelbrot tree
- Mandelbulb
- Menger sponge
- Monkeys tree
- Moore curve
- N-flake
- Pascal triangle
- Peano curve
- Penrose tiling
- Pinwheel tiling
- Pythagoras tree
- Rauzy fractal
- Rössler attractor
- Sierpiński arrowhead curve
- Sierpinski carpet
- Sierpiński curve
- Sierpinski triangle
- Smith–Volterra–Cantor set
- T-square
- Takagi or Blancmange curve
- Triflake
- Vicsek fractal
- von Koch curve
- Weierstrass function
- Z-order curve

=== Random fractals ===
- von Koch curve with random interval
- von Koch curve with random orientation
- polymer shapes
- diffusion-limited aggregation
- Self-avoiding random walk
- Brownian motion
- Lichtenberg figure
- Percolation theory
- Multiplicative cascade

== Regular polytopes ==
This table shows a summary of regular polytope counts by dimension.

Dimension	Convex	Nonconvex	Convex Euclidean tessellations	Convex hyperbolic tessellations	Nonconvex hyperbolic tessellations	Hyperbolic Tessellations with infinite cells and/or vertex figures	Abstract Polytopes
1	1 line segment	0	1	0	0	0	1
2	∞ polygons	∞ star polygons	1	1	0	0	∞
3	5 Platonic solids	4 Kepler–Poinsot solids	3 tilings	∞	∞	∞	∞
4	6 convex polychora	10 Schläfli–Hess polychora	1 honeycomb	4	0	11	∞
5	3 convex 5-polytopes	0	3 tetracombs	5	4	2	∞
6	3 convex 6-polytopes	0	1 pentacombs	0	0	5	∞
7+	3	0	1	0	0	0	∞

There are no nonconvex Euclidean regular tessellations in any number of dimensions.

=== Polytope elements ===
The elements of a polytope can be considered according to either their own dimensionality or how many dimensions "down" they are from the body.

- Vertex, a 0-dimensional element
- Edge, a 1-dimensional element
- Face, a 2-dimensional element
- Cell, a 3-dimensional element
- Hypercell or Teron, a 4-dimensional element
- Facet, an (n-1)-dimensional element
- Ridge, an (n-2)-dimensional element
- Peak, an (n-3)-dimensional element

For example, in a polyhedron (3-dimensional polytope), a face is a facet, an edge is a ridge, and a vertex is a peak.

- Vertex figure: not itself an element of a polytope, but a diagram showing how the elements meet.

=== Tessellations ===
The classical convex polytopes may be considered tessellations, or tilings, of spherical space. Tessellations of euclidean and hyperbolic space may also be considered regular polytopes. Note that an 'n'-dimensional polytope actually tessellates a space of one dimension less. For example, the (three-dimensional) platonic solids tessellate the 'two'-dimensional 'surface' of the sphere.

=== Zero dimension ===
- Point

=== One-dimensional regular polytope ===
There is only one polytope in 1 dimension, whose boundaries are the two endpoints of a line segment, represented by the empty Schläfli symbol {}.

=== Two-dimensional regular polytopes ===
- Polygon
- Equilateral
- Cyclic polygon
- Convex polygon
- Star polygon
- Pentagram

==== Convex ====
- Regular polygon
- Equilateral triangle
- Simplex
- Square
- Cross-polytope
- Hypercube
- Pentagon
- Hexagon
- Heptagon
- Octagon
- Enneagon
- Decagon
- Hendecagon
- Dodecagon
- Tridecagon
- Tetradecagon
- Pentadecagon
- Hexadecagon
- Heptadecagon
- Octadecagon
- Enneadecagon
- Icosagon
- Hectogon
- Chiliagon

===== Degenerate (spherical) =====
- Monogon
- Digon

==== Non-convex ====
- star polygon
- Pentagram
- Heptagram
- Octagram
- Enneagram
- Decagram

==== Tessellation ====
- Apeirogon

=== Three-dimensional regular polytopes ===
- polyhedron

==== Convex ====
- Platonic solid
  - Tetrahedron, the 3-space Simplex
  - Cube, the 3-space hypercube
  - Octahedron, the 3-space Cross-polytope
  - Dodecahedron
  - Icosahedron

==== Degenerate (spherical) ====
- hosohedron
- dihedron
- Henagon#In spherical geometry

==== Non-convex ====
- Kepler–Poinsot polyhedra
  - Small stellated dodecahedron
  - Great dodecahedron
  - Great stellated dodecahedron
  - Great icosahedron

==== Tessellations ====
===== Euclidean tilings =====
- Square tiling
- Triangular tiling
- Hexagonal tiling
- Apeirogon
- Dihedron

===== Hyperbolic tilings =====
- Lobachevski plane
- Hyperbolic tiling

===== Hyperbolic star-tilings =====
- Order-7 heptagrammic tiling
- Heptagrammic-order heptagonal tiling
- Order-9 enneagrammic tiling
- Enneagrammic-order enneagonal tiling

=== Four-dimensional regular polytopes ===
- convex regular 4-polytope
  - 5-cell, the 4-space Simplex
  - 8-cell, the 4-space Hypercube
  - 16-cell, the 4-space Cross-polytope
  - 24-cell
  - 120-cell
  - 600-cell

==== Degenerate (spherical) ====
- Ditope
- Hosotope
- 3-sphere

==== Non-convex ====
- Star or (Schläfli–Hess) regular 4-polytope
  - Icosahedral 120-cell
  - Small stellated 120-cell
  - Great 120-cell
  - Grand 120-cell
  - Great stellated 120-cell
  - Grand stellated 120-cell
  - Great grand 120-cell
  - Great icosahedral 120-cell
  - Grand 600-cell
  - Great grand stellated 120-cell

==== Tessellations of Euclidean 3-space ====
- Honeycomb
- Cubic honeycomb

==== Degenerate tessellations of Euclidean 3-space ====
- Hosohedron
- Dihedron
- Order-2 apeirogonal tiling
- Apeirogonal hosohedron
- Order-4 square hosohedral honeycomb
- Order-6 triangular hosohedral honeycomb
- Hexagonal hosohedral honeycomb
- Order-2 square tiling honeycomb
- Order-2 triangular tiling honeycomb
- Order-2 hexagonal tiling honeycomb

==== Tessellations of hyperbolic 3-space ====
- Order-4 dodecahedral honeycomb
- Order-5 dodecahedral honeycomb
- Order-5 cubic honeycomb
- Icosahedral honeycomb
- Order-3 icosahedral honeycomb
- Order-4 octahedral honeycomb
- Triangular tiling honeycomb
- Square tiling honeycomb
- Order-4 square tiling honeycomb
- Order-6 tetrahedral honeycomb
- Order-6 cubic honeycomb
- Order-6 dodecahedral honeycomb
- Hexagonal tiling honeycomb
- Order-4 hexagonal tiling honeycomb
- Order-5 hexagonal tiling honeycomb
- Order-6 hexagonal tiling honeycomb

=== Five-dimensional regular polytopes and higher ===
- 5-polytope
- Honeycomb
- Tetracomb

Simplex	Hypercube	Cross-polytope
5-simplex	5-cube	5-orthoplex
6-simplex	6-cube	6-orthoplex

==== Tessellations of Euclidean 4-space ====
- honeycombs
- Tesseractic honeycomb
- 16-cell honeycomb
- 24-cell honeycomb

==== Tessellations of Euclidean 5-space and higher ====
- Hypercubic honeycomb
- Hypercube
- Square tiling
- Cubic honeycomb
- Tesseractic honeycomb
- 5-cube honeycomb
- 6-cube honeycomb
- 7-cube honeycomb
- 8-cube honeycomb

==== Tessellations of hyperbolic 4-space ====
- honeycombs
- Order-5 5-cell honeycomb
- 120-cell honeycomb
- Order-5 tesseractic honeycomb
- Order-4 120-cell honeycomb
- Order-5 120-cell honeycomb
- Order-4 24-cell honeycomb
- Cubic honeycomb honeycomb
- Small stellated 120-cell honeycomb
- Pentagrammic-order 600-cell honeycomb
- Order-5 icosahedral 120-cell honeycomb
- Great 120-cell honeycomb

==== Tessellations of hyperbolic 5-space ====
- 5-orthoplex honeycomb
- 24-cell honeycomb honeycomb
- 16-cell honeycomb honeycomb
- Order-4 24-cell honeycomb honeycomb
- Tesseractic honeycomb honeycomb

=== Apeirotopes ===
- Apeirotope
  - Apeirogon
  - Apeirohedron
  - Regular skew polyhedron

=== Abstract polytopes ===
- Abstract polytope
  - 11-cell
  - 57-cell

== 2D with 1D surface ==
- Convex polygon
- Concave polygon
- Constructible polygon
- Cyclic polygon
- Equiangular polygon
- Equilateral polygon
- Regular polygon
- Penrose tile
- Polyform
- Balbis
- Gnomon
- Golygon
- Star without crossing lines
- Star polygon
  - Hexagram
    - Star of David
  - Heptagram
  - Octagram
    - Star of Lakshmi
  - Decagram
  - Pentagram

Polygons named for their number of sides

- Monogon — 1 sided
- Digon — 2 sided
- Triangle
  - Acute triangle
  - Equilateral triangle
  - Isosceles triangle
  - Obtuse triangle
  - Rational triangle
  - Right triangle
    - 30-60-90 triangle
    - Isosceles right triangle
    - Kepler triangle
  - Scalene triangle
- Quadrilateral
  - Cyclic quadrilateral
    - square
  - kite
  - Parallelogram
    - Rhombus (equilateral parallelogram)
      - Lozenge
    - Rhomboid
    - Rectangle
      - square (regular quadrilateral)
  - Tangential quadrilateral
  - Trapezoid or trapezium
    - Isosceles trapezoid
- Pentagon
  - Regular pentagon
- Hexagon
  - Lemoine hexagon
- Heptagon
- Octagon
  - Regular octagon
- Nonagon
- Decagon
  - Regular decagon
- Hendecagon
- Dodecagon
- Triskaidecagon
- Tetradecagon
- Pentadecagon
- Hexadecagon
- Heptadecagon
- Octadecagon
- Enneadecagon
- Icosagon
- Triacontagon
- Tetracontagon
- Pentacontagon
- Hexacontagon
- Heptacontagon
- Octacontagon
- Enneacontagon
- Hectogon
- 257-gon
- Chiliagon
- Myriagon
- 65537-gon
- Megagon
- Apeirogon

=== Tilings ===
- List of uniform tilings
- Uniform tilings in hyperbolic plane
- Archimedean tiling
  - Square tiling
  - Triangular tiling
  - Hexagonal tiling
  - Truncated square tiling
  - Snub square tiling
  - Trihexagonal tiling
  - Truncated hexagonal tiling
  - Rhombitrihexagonal tiling
  - Truncated trihexagonal tiling
  - Snub hexagonal tiling
  - Elongated triangular tiling

=== Uniform polyhedra ===
- Regular polyhedron
  - Platonic solid
    - Tetrahedron
    - Cube
    - Octahedron
    - Dodecahedron
    - Icosahedron
  - Kepler–Poinsot polyhedron (regular star polyhedra)
    - Great icosahedron
    - Small stellated dodecahedron
    - Great dodecahedron
    - Great stellated dodecahedron
  - Abstract regular polyhedra (Projective polyhedron)
    - Hemicube
    - Hemi-octahedron
    - Hemi-dodecahedron
    - Hemi-icosahedron
- Archimedean solid
  - Truncated tetrahedron
  - Cuboctahedron
  - Truncated cube
  - Truncated octahedron
  - Rhombicuboctahedron
  - Truncated cuboctahedron
  - Snub cube
  - Icosidodecahedron
  - Truncated dodecahedron
  - Truncated icosahedron
  - Rhombicosidodecahedron
  - Truncated icosidodecahedron
  - Snub dodecahedron
- Prismatic uniform polyhedron
  - Prism
  - Antiprism
- Uniform star polyhedron
  - Cubitruncated cuboctahedron
  - Cubohemioctahedron
  - Ditrigonal dodecadodecahedron
  - Dodecadodecahedron
  - Great cubicuboctahedron
  - Great dirhombicosidodecahedron
  - Great disnub dirhombidodecahedron
  - Great ditrigonal dodecicosidodecahedron
  - Great ditrigonal icosidodecahedron
  - Great dodecahemicosahedron
  - Great dodecahemidodecahedron
  - Great dodecicosahedron
  - Great dodecicosidodecahedron
  - Great icosicosidodecahedron
  - Great icosidodecahedron
  - Great icosihemidodecahedron
  - Great inverted snub icosidodecahedron
  - Great retrosnub icosidodecahedron
  - Great rhombidodecahedron
  - Great rhombihexahedron
  - Great snub dodecicosidodecahedron
  - Great snub icosidodecahedron
  - Great stellated truncated dodecahedron
  - Great truncated cuboctahedron
  - Great truncated icosidodecahedron
  - Icosidodecadodecahedron
  - Icositruncated dodecadodecahedron
  - Inverted snub dodecadodecahedron
  - Nonconvex great rhombicosidodecahedron
  - Nonconvex great rhombicuboctahedron
  - Octahemioctahedron
  - Rhombicosahedron
  - Rhombidodecadodecahedron
  - Small cubicuboctahedron
  - Small ditrigonal dodecicosidodecahedron
  - Small ditrigonal icosidodecahedron
  - Small dodecahemicosahedron
  - Small dodecahemidodecahedron
  - Small dodecicosahedron
  - Small dodecicosidodecahedron
  - Small icosicosidodecahedron
  - Small icosihemidodecahedron
  - Small retrosnub icosicosidodecahedron
  - Small rhombidodecahedron
  - Small rhombihexahedron
  - Small snub icosicosidodecahedron
  - Small stellated truncated dodecahedron
  - Snub dodecadodecahedron
  - Snub icosidodecadodecahedron
  - Stellated truncated hexahedron
  - Tetrahemihexahedron
  - Truncated dodecadodecahedron
  - Truncated great dodecahedron
  - Truncated great icosahedron

=== Duals of uniform polyhedra ===
- Catalan solid
  - Triakis tetrahedron
  - Rhombic dodecahedron
  - Triakis octahedron
  - Tetrakis hexahedron
  - Deltoidal icositetrahedron
  - Disdyakis dodecahedron
  - Pentagonal icositetrahedron
  - Rhombic triacontahedron
  - Triakis icosahedron
  - Pentakis dodecahedron
  - Deltoidal hexecontahedron
  - Disdyakis triacontahedron
  - Pentagonal hexecontahedron
- non-convex
  - Great complex icosidodecahedron
  - Great deltoidal hexecontahedron
  - Great deltoidal icositetrahedron
  - Great dirhombicosidodecacron
  - Great dirhombicosidodecahedron
  - Great disdyakis dodecahedron
  - Great disdyakis triacontahedron
  - Great disnub dirhombidodecacron
  - Great ditrigonal dodecacronic hexecontahedron
  - Great dodecacronic hexecontahedron
  - Great dodecahemicosacron
  - Great dodecicosacron
  - Great hexacronic icositetrahedron
  - Great hexagonal hexecontahedron
  - Great icosacronic hexecontahedron
  - Great icosihemidodecacron
  - Great inverted pentagonal hexecontahedron
  - Great pentagonal hexecontahedron
  - Great pentagrammic hexecontahedron
  - Great pentakis dodecahedron
  - Great rhombic triacontahedron
  - Great rhombidodecacron
  - Great rhombihexacron
  - Great stellapentakis dodecahedron
  - Great triakis icosahedron
  - Great triakis octahedron
  - Great triambic icosahedron
  - Medial deltoidal hexecontahedron
  - Medial disdyakis triacontahedron
  - Medial hexagonal hexecontahedron
  - Medial icosacronic hexecontahedron
  - Medial inverted pentagonal hexecontahedron
  - Medial pentagonal hexecontahedron
  - Medial rhombic triacontahedron
  - Hexahemioctacron
  - Hemipolyhedron
  - Octahemioctacron
  - Rhombicosacron
  - Small complex icosidodecahedron
  - Small ditrigonal dodecacronic hexecontahedron
  - Small dodecacronic hexecontahedron
  - Small dodecahemicosacron
  - Small dodecahemidodecacron
  - Small dodecicosacron
  - Small hexacronic icositetrahedron
  - Small hexagonal hexecontahedron
  - Small hexagrammic hexecontahedron
  - Small icosacronic hexecontahedron
  - Small icosihemidodecacron
  - Small rhombidodecacron
  - Small rhombihexacron
  - Small stellapentakis dodecahedron
  - Small triambic icosahedron
  - Tetrahemihexacron

=== Johnson solids ===
- Augmented dodecahedron
- Augmented hexagonal prism
- Augmented pentagonal prism
- Augmented sphenocorona
- Augmented triangular prism
- Augmented tridiminished icosahedron
- Augmented truncated cube
- Augmented truncated dodecahedron
- Augmented truncated tetrahedron
- Biaugmented pentagonal prism
- Biaugmented triangular prism
- Biaugmented truncated cube
- Bigyrate diminished rhombicosidodecahedron
- Bilunabirotunda
- Diminished rhombicosidodecahedron
- Disphenocingulum
- Elongated pentagonal bipyramid
- Elongated pentagonal cupola
- Elongated pentagonal gyrobicupola
- Elongated pentagonal gyrobirotunda
- Elongated pentagonal gyrocupolarotunda
- Elongated pentagonal orthobicupola
- Elongated pentagonal orthobirotunda
- Elongated pentagonal orthocupolarotunda
- Elongated pentagonal pyramid
- Elongated pentagonal rotunda
- Elongated square bipyramid
- Elongated square cupola
- Elongated square gyrobicupola
- Elongated square pyramid
- Elongated triangular bipyramid
- Elongated triangular cupola
- Elongated triangular gyrobicupola
- Elongated triangular orthobicupola
- Elongated triangular pyramid
- Gyrate bidiminished rhombicosidodecahedron
- Gyrate rhombicosidodecahedron
- Gyrobifastigium
- Gyroelongated pentagonal bicupola
- Gyroelongated pentagonal birotunda
- Gyroelongated pentagonal cupola
- Gyroelongated pentagonal cupolarotunda
- Gyroelongated pentagonal pyramid
- Gyroelongated pentagonal rotunda
- Gyroelongated square bicupola
- Gyroelongated square bipyramid
- Gyroelongated square cupola
- Gyroelongated square pyramid
- Gyroelongated triangular bicupola
- Gyroelongated triangular cupola
- Hebesphenomegacorona
- Metabiaugmented dodecahedron
- Metabiaugmented hexagonal prism
- Metabiaugmented truncated dodecahedron
- Metabidiminished icosahedron
- Metabidiminished rhombicosidodecahedron
- Metabigyrate rhombicosidodecahedron
- Metagyrate diminished rhombicosidodecahedron
- Parabiaugmented dodecahedron
- Parabiaugmented hexagonal prism
- Parabiaugmented truncated dodecahedron
- Parabidiminished rhombicosidodecahedron
- Parabigyrate rhombicosidodecahedron
- Paragyrate diminished rhombicosidodecahedron
- Pentagonal bipyramid
- Pentagonal cupola
- Pentagonal gyrobicupola
- Pentagonal gyrocupolarotunda
- Pentagonal orthobicupola
- Pentagonal orthobirotunda
- Pentagonal orthocupolarotunda
- Pentagonal pyramid
- Pentagonal rotunda
- Snub disphenoid
- Snub square antiprism
- Sphenocorona
- Sphenomegacorona
- Square cupola
- Square gyrobicupola
- Square orthobicupola
- Square pyramid
- Triangular bipyramid
- Triangular cupola
- Triangular hebesphenorotunda
- Triangular orthobicupola
- Triaugmented dodecahedron
- Triaugmented hexagonal prism
- Triaugmented triangular prism
- Triaugmented truncated dodecahedron
- Tridiminished icosahedron
- Tridiminished rhombicosidodecahedron
- Trigyrate rhombicosidodecahedron

=== Other nonuniform polyhedra ===
- Pyramid
- Bipyramid
- Disphenoid
- Parallelepiped
- Cuboid
- Rhombohedron
- Trapezohedron
- Frustum
- Trapezo-rhombic dodecahedron
- Rhombo-hexagonal dodecahedron
- Truncated trapezohedron
- Deltahedron
- Zonohedron
- Prismatoid
- Cupola
- Bicupola

=== Spherical polyhedra ===
- Dihedron
- Hosohedron

=== Honeycombs ===
Convex uniform honeycomb

- Cubic honeycomb
- Truncated cubic honeycomb
- Bitruncated cubic honeycomb
- Cantellated cubic honeycomb
- Cantitruncated cubic honeycomb
- Rectified cubic honeycomb
- Runcitruncated cubic honeycomb
- Omnitruncated cubic honeycomb
- Tetrahedral-octahedral honeycomb
- Truncated alternated cubic honeycomb
- Cantitruncated alternated cubic honeycomb
- Runcinated alternated cubic honeycomb
- Quarter cubic honeycomb
- Gyrated tetrahedral-octahedral honeycomb
- Gyrated triangular prismatic honeycomb
- Gyroelongated alternated cubic honeycomb
- Gyroelongated triangular prismatic honeycomb
- Elongated triangular prismatic honeycomb
- Elongated alternated cubic honeycomb
- Hexagonal prismatic honeycomb
- Triangular prismatic honeycomb
- Triangular-hexagonal prismatic honeycomb
- Truncated hexagonal prismatic honeycomb
- Truncated square prismatic honeycomb
- Rhombitriangular-hexagonal prismatic honeycomb
- Omnitruncated triangular-hexagonal prismatic honeycomb
- Snub triangular-hexagonal prismatic honeycomb
- Snub square prismatic honeycomb

Dual uniform honeycomb

- Disphenoid tetrahedral honeycomb
- Rhombic dodecahedral honeycomb

Others

- Trapezo-rhombic dodecahedral honeycomb
- Weaire–Phelan structure

Convex uniform honeycombs in hyperbolic space

- Order-4 dodecahedral honeycomb
- Order-5 cubic honeycomb
- Order-5 dodecahedral honeycomb
- Icosahedral honeycomb

=== Other ===
- Apeirogonal prism
- Apeirohedron
- Bicupola
- Cupola
- Bifrustum
- Boerdijk–Coxeter helix
- Császár polyhedron
- Flexible polyhedron
- Gyroelongated square dipyramid
- Heronian tetrahedron
- Hexagonal bifrustum
- Hexagonal truncated trapezohedron
- Hill tetrahedron
- Holyhedron
- Infinite skew polyhedron
- Jessen's icosahedron
- Near-miss Johnson solid
- Parallelepiped
- Pentagonal bifrustum
- Polytetrahedron
- Pyritohedron
- Rhombic enneacontahedron
- Rhombic icosahedron
- Rhombo-hexagonal dodecahedron
- Rhombohedron
- Scalenohedron
- Schönhardt polyhedron
- Square bifrustum
- Square truncated trapezohedron
- Szilassi polyhedron
- Tetradecahedron
- Tetradyakis hexahedron
- Tetrated dodecahedron
- Triangular bifrustum
- Triaugmented triangular prism
- Truncated rhombic dodecahedron
- Truncated trapezohedron
- Truncated triakis tetrahedron
- Tridyakis icosahedron
- Trigonal trapezohedron
- Regular skew polyhedron
- Waterman polyhedron
- Wedge

=== Regular and uniform compound polyhedra ===
Polyhedral compound and Uniform polyhedron compound

- Compound of cube and octahedron
- Compound of dodecahedron and icosahedron
- Compound of eight octahedra with rotational freedom
- Compound of eight triangular prisms
- Compound of five cubes
- Compound of five cuboctahedra
- Compound of five cubohemioctahedra
- Compound of five great cubicuboctahedra
- Compound of five great dodecahedra
- Compound of five great icosahedra
- Compound of five great rhombihexahedra
- Compound of five icosahedra
- Compound of five octahedra
- Compound of five octahemioctahedra
- Compound of five small cubicuboctahedra
- Compound of five small rhombicuboctahedra
- Compound of five small rhombihexahedra
- Compound of five small stellated dodecahedra
- Compound of five stellated truncated cubes
- Compound of five tetrahedra
- Compound of five tetrahemihexahedra
- Compound of five truncated cubes
- Compound of five truncated tetrahedra
- Compound of five uniform great rhombicuboctahedra
- Compound of four hexagonal prisms
- Compound of four octahedra
- Compound of four octahedra with rotational freedom
- Compound of four tetrahedra
- Compound of four triangular prisms
- Compound of great icosahedron and great stellated dodecahedron
- Compound of six cubes with rotational freedom
- Compound of six decagonal prisms
- Compound of six decagrammic prisms
- Compound of six pentagonal prisms
- Compound of six pentagrammic crossed antiprisms
- Compound of six pentagrammic prisms
- Compound of six tetrahedra
- Compound of six tetrahedra with rotational freedom
- Compound of small stellated dodecahedron and great dodecahedron
- Compound of ten hexagonal prisms
- Compound of ten octahedra
- Compound of ten tetrahedra
- Compound of ten triangular prisms
- Compound of ten truncated tetrahedra
- Compound of three cubes
- Compound of three tetrahedra
- Compound of twelve pentagonal antiprisms with rotational freedom
- Compound of twelve pentagonal prisms
- Compound of twelve pentagrammic prisms
- Compound of twelve tetrahedra with rotational freedom
- Compound of twenty octahedra
- Compound of twenty octahedra with rotational freedom
- Compound of twenty tetrahemihexahedra
- Compound of twenty triangular prisms
- Compound of two great dodecahedra
- Compound of two great icosahedra
- Compound of two great inverted snub icosidodecahedra
- Compound of two great retrosnub icosidodecahedra
- Compound of two great snub icosidodecahedra
- Compound of two icosahedra
- Compound of two inverted snub dodecadodecahedra
- Compound of two small stellated dodecahedra
- Compound of two snub cubes
- Compound of two snub dodecadodecahedra
- Compound of two snub dodecahedra
- Compound of two snub icosidodecadodecahedra
- Compound of two truncated tetrahedra
- Prismatic compound of antiprisms
- Prismatic compound of antiprisms with rotational freedom
- Prismatic compound of prisms
- Prismatic compound of prisms with rotational freedom
- 4-polytope
  - Hecatonicosachoron
  - Hexacosichoron
  - Hexadecachoron
  - Icositetrachoron
  - Pentachoron
  - Tesseract
- Hypercone

Convex regular 4-polytope

- 5-cell, Tesseract, 16-cell, 24-cell, 120-cell, 600-cell

Abstract regular polytope

- 11-cell, 57-cell

Schläfli–Hess 4-polytope (Regular star 4-polytope)

- Icosahedral 120-cell, Small stellated 120-cell, Great 120-cell, Grand 120-cell, Great stellated 120-cell, Grand stellated 120-cell, Great grand 120-cell, Great icosahedral 120-cell, Grand 600-cell, Great grand stellated 120-cell

Uniform 4-polytope

- Rectified 5-cell, Truncated 5-cell, Cantellated 5-cell, Runcinated 5-cell
- Rectified tesseract, Truncated tesseract, Cantellated tesseract, Runcinated tesseract
- Rectified 16-cell, Truncated 16-cell
- Rectified 24-cell, Truncated 24-cell, Cantellated 24-cell, Runcinated 24-cell, Snub 24-cell
- Rectified 120-cell, Truncated 120-cell, Cantellated 120-cell, Runcinated 120-cell
- Rectified 600-cell, Truncated 600-cell, Cantellated 600-cell

Prismatic uniform polychoron

- Grand antiprism
- Duoprism
- Tetrahedral prism, Truncated tetrahedral prism
- Truncated cubic prism, Truncated octahedral prism, Cuboctahedral prism, Rhombicuboctahedral prism, Truncated cuboctahedral prism, Snub cubic prism
- Truncated dodecahedral prism, Truncated icosahedral prism, Icosidodecahedral prism, Rhombicosidodecahedral prism, Truncated icosidodecahedral prism, Snub dodecahedral prism
- Uniform antiprismatic prism

=== Honeycombs ===
- Tesseractic honeycomb
- 24-cell honeycomb
- Snub 24-cell honeycomb
- Rectified 24-cell honeycomb
- Truncated 24-cell honeycomb
- 16-cell honeycomb
- 5-cell honeycomb
- Omnitruncated 5-cell honeycomb
- Truncated 5-cell honeycomb
- Omnitruncated 5-simplex honeycomb

== 5D with 4D surfaces ==
- regular 5-polytope
  - 5-dimensional cross-polytope
  - 5-dimensional hypercube
  - 5-dimensional simplex

Five-dimensional space, 5-polytope and uniform 5-polytope

- 5-simplex, Rectified 5-simplex, Truncated 5-simplex, Cantellated 5-simplex, Runcinated 5-simplex, Stericated 5-simplex
- 5-demicube, Truncated 5-demicube, Cantellated 5-demicube, Runcinated 5-demicube
- 5-cube, Rectified 5-cube, 5-cube, Truncated 5-cube, Cantellated 5-cube, Runcinated 5-cube, Stericated 5-cube
- 5-orthoplex, Rectified 5-orthoplex, Truncated 5-orthoplex, Cantellated 5-orthoplex, Runcinated 5-orthoplex

Prismatic uniform 5-polytope
For each polytope of dimension n, there is a prism of dimension n+1.

=== Honeycombs ===
- 5-cubic honeycomb
- 5-simplex honeycomb
- Truncated 5-simplex honeycomb
- 5-demicubic honeycomb

== Six dimensions ==
Six-dimensional space, 6-polytope and uniform 6-polytope

- 6-simplex, Rectified 6-simplex, Truncated 6-simplex, Cantellated 6-simplex, Runcinated 6-simplex, Stericated 6-simplex, Pentellated 6-simplex
- 6-demicube, Truncated 6-demicube, Cantellated 6-demicube, Runcinated 6-demicube, Stericated 6-demicube
- 6-cube, Rectified 6-cube, 6-cube, Truncated 6-cube, Cantellated 6-cube, Runcinated 6-cube, Stericated 6-cube, Pentellated 6-cube
- 6-orthoplex, Rectified 6-orthoplex, Truncated 6-orthoplex, Cantellated 6-orthoplex, Runcinated 6-orthoplex, Stericated 6-orthoplex
- 1_{22} polytope, 2_{21} polytope

=== Honeycombs ===
- 6-cubic honeycomb
- 6-simplex honeycomb
- 6-demicubic honeycomb
- 2_{22} honeycomb

== Seven dimensions ==
Seven-dimensional space, uniform 7-polytope

- 7-simplex, Rectified 7-simplex, Truncated 7-simplex, Cantellated 7-simplex, Runcinated 7-simplex, Stericated 7-simplex, Pentellated 7-simplex, Hexicated 7-simplex
- 7-demicube, Truncated 7-demicube, Cantellated 7-demicube, Runcinated 7-demicube, Stericated 7-demicube, Pentellated 7-demicube
- 7-cube, Rectified 7-cube, 7-cube, Truncated 7-cube, Cantellated 7-cube, Runcinated 7-cube, Stericated 7-cube, Pentellated 7-cube, Hexicated 7-cube
- 7-orthoplex, Rectified 7-orthoplex, Truncated 7-orthoplex, Cantellated 7-orthoplex, Runcinated 7-orthoplex, Stericated 7-orthoplex, Pentellated 7-orthoplex
- 1_{32} polytope, 2_{31} polytope, 3_{21} polytope

=== Honeycombs ===
- 7-cubic honeycomb
- 7-demicubic honeycomb
- 3_{31} honeycomb, 1_{33} honeycomb

== Eight dimensions ==
Eight-dimensional space, uniform 8-polytope

- 8-simplex, Rectified 8-simplex, Truncated 8-simplex, Cantellated 8-simplex, Runcinated 8-simplex, Stericated 8-simplex, Pentellated 8-simplex, Hexicated 8-simplex, Heptellated 8-simplex
- 8-orthoplex, Rectified 8-orthoplex, Truncated 8-orthoplex, Cantellated 8-orthoplex, Runcinated 8-orthoplex, Stericated 8-orthoplex, Pentellated 8-orthoplex, Hexicated 8-orthoplex
- 8-cube, Rectified 8-cube, Truncated 8-cube, Cantellated 8-cube, Runcinated 8-cube, Stericated 8-cube, Pentellated 8-cube, Hexicated 8-cube, Heptellated 8-cube
- 8-demicube, Truncated 8-demicube, Cantellated 8-demicube, Runcinated 8-demicube, Stericated 8-demicube, Pentellated 8-demicube, Hexicated 8-demicube
- 1_{42} polytope, 2_{41} polytope, 4_{21} polytope, Truncated 4_{21} polytope, Truncated 2_{41} polytope, Truncated 1_{42} polytope, Cantellated 4_{21} polytope, Cantellated 2_{41} polytope, Runcinated 4_{21} polytope

=== Honeycombs ===
- 8-cubic honeycomb
- 8-demicubic honeycomb
- 5_{21} honeycomb, 2_{51} honeycomb, 1_{52} honeycomb

== Nine dimensions ==
9-polytope

- 9-cube
- 9-demicube
- 9-orthoplex
- 9-simplex

=== Hyperbolic honeycombs ===
- E_{9} honeycomb

== Ten dimensions ==
10-polytope

- 10-cube
- 10-demicube
- 10-orthoplex
- 10-simplex

== Dimensional families ==
Regular polytope and List of regular polytopes

- Simplex
- Hypercube
- Cross-polytope

Uniform polytope

- Demihypercube
- Uniform 1_{k2} polytope
- Uniform 2_{k1} polytope
- Uniform k_{21} polytope

Honeycombs

- Hypercubic honeycomb
- Alternated hypercubic honeycomb

== Geometry ==
- Triangle
- Automedian triangle
- Delaunay triangulation
- Equilateral triangle
- Golden triangle
- Hyperbolic triangle (non-Euclidean geometry)
- Isosceles triangle
- Kepler triangle
- Reuleaux triangle
- Right triangle
- Sierpinski triangle (fractal geometry)
- Special right triangles
- Spiral of Theodorus
- Thomson cubic
- Triangular bipyramid
- Triangular prism
- Triangular pyramid
- Triangular tiling

== Geometry and other areas of mathematics ==
Ford circles

- Annulus
- Apollonian circles
- Apollonian gasket
- Arbelos
- Borromean rings
- Circle
- Circular sector
- Circular segment
- Cyclic quadrilateral
- Cycloid
- Epitrochoid
  - Epicycloid
    - Cardioid
    - Nephroid
    - Deferent and epicycle
- Ex-tangential quadrilateral
- Horocycle
- Hypotrochoid
  - Hypocycloid
    - Astroid
    - Deltoid curve
- Lune
- Pappus chain
- Peaucellier–Lipkin linkage
- Robbins pentagon
- Salinon
- Semicircle
- Squircle
- Steiner chain
- Tangential quadrilateral
  - Bicentric quadrilateral

== Glyphs and symbols ==
- Borromean rings
- Crescent
- Vesica piscis
- Arc
- Caustic
- Cissoid
- Conchoid
- Cubic Hermite curve
- Curve of constant width
- hedgehog
- Parametric curve
  - Bézier curve
  - Spline
    - Hermite spline
      - Beta spline
        - B-spline
    - Higher-order spline
    - NURBS
- Ray
- Reuleaux triangle
- Ribaucour curve

== Table of all the Shapes ==
This is a table of all the shapes above.

Table of Shapes
Section	Sub-Section	Sup-Section	Name
Algebraic Curves	¿ Curves	¿ Curves	Cubic Plane Curve
Algebraic Curves	¿ Curves	¿ Curves	Quartic Plane Curve
Algebraic Curves	Rational Curves	Degree 2	Conic Section(s)
Algebraic Curves	Rational Curves	Degree 2	Unit Circle
Algebraic Curves	Rational Curves	Degree 2	Unit Hyperbola
Algebraic Curves	Rational Curves	Degree 3	Folium of Descartes
Algebraic Curves	Rational Curves	Degree 3	Cissoid of Diocles
Algebraic Curves	Rational Curves	Degree 3	Conchoid of de Sluze
Algebraic Curves	Rational Curves	Degree 3	Right Strophoid
Algebraic Curves	Rational Curves	Degree 3	Semicubical Parabola
Algebraic Curves	Rational Curves	Degree 3	Serpentine Curve
Algebraic Curves	Rational Curves	Degree 3	Trident Curve
Algebraic Curves	Rational Curves	Degree 3	Trisectrix of Maclaurin
Algebraic Curves	Rational Curves	Degree 3	Tschirnhausen Cubic
Algebraic Curves	Rational Curves	Degree 3	Witch of Agnesi
Algebraic Curves	Rational Curves	Degree 4	Ampersand Curve
Algebraic Curves	Rational Curves	Degree 4	Bean Curve
Algebraic Curves	Rational Curves	Degree 4	Bicorn
Algebraic Curves	Rational Curves	Degree 4	Bow Curve
Algebraic Curves	Rational Curves	Degree 4	Bullet-Nose Curve
Algebraic Curves	Rational Curves	Degree 4	Cruciform Curve
