= Pentagrammic-order 600-cell honeycomb =

Pentagrammic-order 600-cell honeycomb
(No image)
Type	Hyperbolic regular honeycomb
Schläfli symbol	{3,3,5,5/2}
Coxeter diagram	
4-faces	{3,3,5}
Cells	{3,3}
Faces	{3}
Face figure	{5/2}
Edge figure	{5,5/2}
Vertex figure	{3,5,5/2}
Dual	Small stellated 120-cell honeycomb
Coxeter group	H̅_{4}, [5,3,3,3]
Properties	Regular

In the geometry of hyperbolic 4-space, the pentagrammic-order 600-cell honeycomb is one of four regular star-honeycombs. With Schläfli symbol {3,3,5,5/2}, it has five 600-cells around each face in a pentagrammic arrangement. Acronym: fipte

It is dual to the small stellated 120-cell honeycomb. It can be considered the higher-dimensional analogue of the 4-dimensional icosahedral 120-cell and the 3-dimensional great dodecahedron. It is related to the order-5 icosahedral 120-cell honeycomb and great 120-cell honeycomb: the icosahedral 120-cells and great 120-cells in each honeycomb are replaced by the 600-cells that are their convex hulls, thus forming the pentagrammic-order 600-cell honeycomb.

This honeycomb can also be constructed by taking the order-5 5-cell honeycomb and replacing clusters of 600 5-cells meeting at a vertex with 600-cells. Each 5-cell belongs to five such clusters, and thus the pentagrammic-order 600-cell honeycomb has density 5.

== See also ==
- List of regular polytopes
