= Compound of two great icosahedra =

Polyhedral compound

Compound of two great icosahedra
Type	Uniform compound
Index	UC_{52}
Polyhedra	2 great icosahedra
Faces	16+24 triangles
Edges	60
Vertices	24
Symmetry group	octahedral (O_{h})
Subgroup restricting to one constituent	pyritohedral (T_{h})

3D model of a compound of two great icosahedra

In geometry, the compound of two great icosahedra is a uniform polyhedron compound. It is composed of 2 great icosahedra, in the same arrangement as in the compound of 2 icosahedra.

The triangles in this compound decompose into two orbits under action of the symmetry group: 16 of the triangles lie in coplanar pairs in octahedral planes, while the other 24 lie in unique planes.

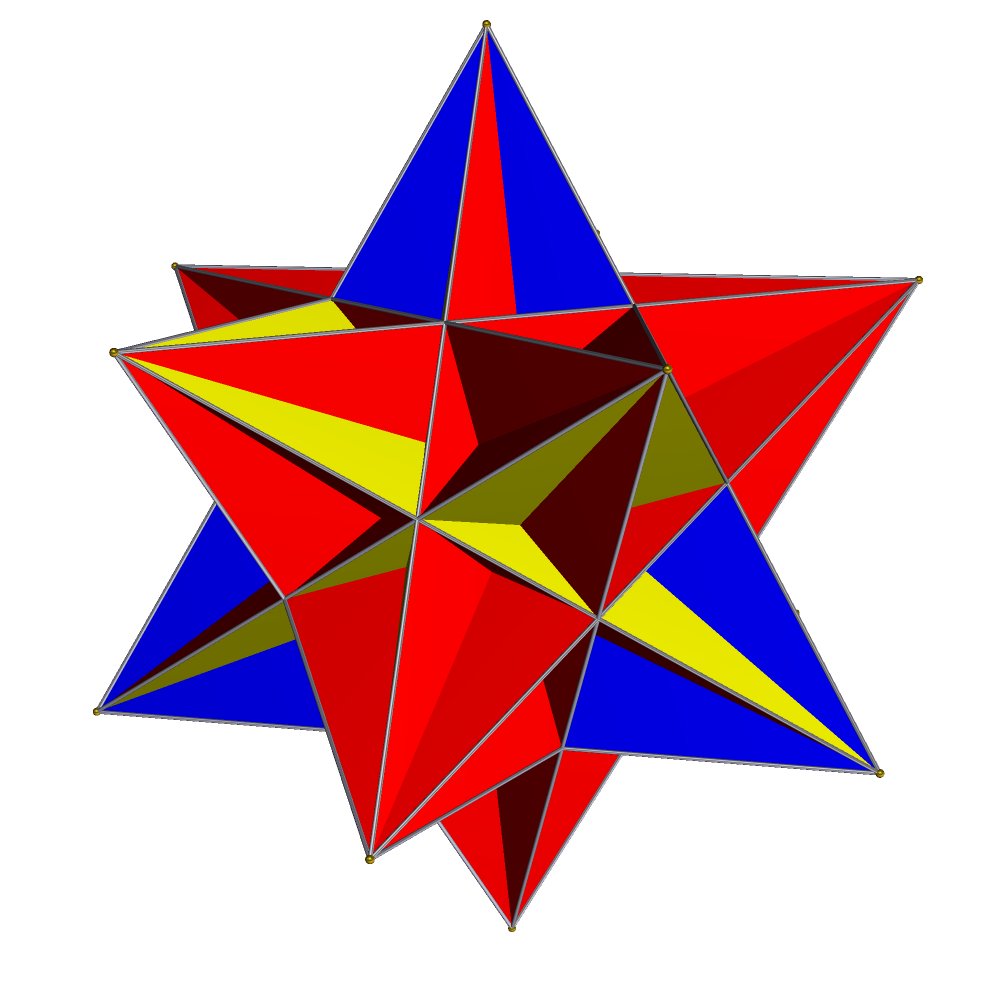
The great icosahedron, as a uniform retrosnub tetrahedron , is similar to these snub-pair compounds: compound of two icosahedra, compound of two snub cubes and compound of two snub dodecahedra.
