= U38 =

U38 or U-38 may refer to:

- German submarine U-38, various vessels
- HMS Cygnet (U38), a sloop of the Royal Navy
- Rhombidodecadodecahedron
- Schweizer RU-38 Twin Condor, an American utility aircraft
- Small nucleolar RNA SNORD38
