= U46 =

U46, U 46 or U-46 may refer to:

- Elgin Area School District U46, in Elgin, Illinois
- German submarine U-46, various vessels
- HMIS Kistna (U46), a sloop of the Royal Indian Navy
- Small nucleolar RNA SNORD46
- Snub icosidodecadodecahedron
- Uppland Runic Inscription 46
- U46, a line of the Dortmund Stadtbahn
