= Bullet nose =

Bullet nose may refer to:

- Bullet-nose curve
- Bullet Nosed Betty
- Nose bullet
