= Order-5 5-cell honeycomb =

Compact regular space-filling tessellation

Order-5 5-cell honeycomb
(No image)
Type	Hyperbolic regular honeycomb
Schläfli symbol	{3,3,3,5}
Coxeter diagram	
4-faces	{3,3,3}
Cells	{3,3}
Faces	{3}
Face figure	{5}
Edge figure	{3,5}
Vertex figure	{3,3,5}
Dual	120-cell honeycomb
Coxeter group	H̅_{4}, [5,3,3,3]
Properties	Regular

In the geometry of hyperbolic 4-space, the order-5 5-cell honeycomb is one of five compact regular space-filling tessellations (or honeycombs). With Schläfli symbol {3,3,3,5}, it has five 5-cells around each face. Acronym: pente

Its dual is the 120-cell honeycomb, {5,3,3,3}.

== Related honeycombs ==
It is related to the order-5 tesseractic honeycomb, {4,3,3,5}, and order-5 120-cell honeycomb, {5,3,3,5}.

It is topologically similar to the finite 5-orthoplex, {3,3,3,4}, and 5-simplex, {3,3,3,3}.

It is analogous to the 600-cell, {3,3,5}, and icosahedron, {3,5}.

== See also ==
- List of regular polytopes
