= Small stellated 120-cell honeycomb =

Small stellated 120-cell honeycomb
(No image)
Type	Hyperbolic regular honeycomb
Schläfli symbol	{5/2,5,3,3}
Coxeter diagram	
4-faces	{5/2,5,3}
Cells	{5/2,5}
Faces	{5/2}
Face figure	{3}
Edge figure	{3,3}
Vertex figure	{5,3,3}
Dual	Pentagrammic-order 600-cell honeycomb
Coxeter group	H̅_{4}, [5,3,3,3]
Properties	Regular

In the geometry of hyperbolic 4-space, the small stellated 120-cell honeycomb is one of four regular star-honeycombs. With Schläfli symbol {5/2,5,3,3}, it has three small stellated 120-cells around each face. Acronym: sishitte

It is dual to the pentagrammic-order 600-cell honeycomb.

It can be seen as a stellation of the 120-cell honeycomb, and is thus analogous to the three-dimensional small stellated dodecahedron {5/2,5} and four-dimensional small stellated 120-cell {5/2,5,3}. It has density 5.

== See also ==
- List of regular polytopes
