= Order-5 icosahedral 120-cell honeycomb =

Order-5 icosahedral 120-cell honeycomb
(No image)
Type	Hyperbolic regular honeycomb
Schläfli symbol	{3,5,5/2,5}
Coxeter diagram	
4-faces	{3,5,5/2}
Cells	{3,5}
Faces	{3}
Face figure	{5}
Edge figure	{5/2,5}
Vertex figure	{5,5/2,5}
Dual	Great 120-cell honeycomb
Coxeter group	H̅_{4}, [5,3,3,3]
Properties	Regular

In the geometry of hyperbolic 4-space, the order-5 icosahedral 120-cell honeycomb is one of four regular star-honeycombs. With Schläfli symbol {3,5,5/2,5}, it has five icosahedral 120-cells around each face. Acronym: tifipte

It is dual to the great 120-cell honeycomb.

It can be constructed by replacing the great dodecahedral cells of the great 120-cell honeycomb with their icosahedral convex hulls, thus replacing the great 120-cells with icosahedral 120-cells. It is thus analogous to the four-dimensional icosahedral 120-cell. It has density 10.

== See also ==
- List of regular polytopes
