= Great 120-cell honeycomb =

Great 120-cell honeycomb
(No image)
Type	Hyperbolic regular honeycomb
Schläfli symbol	{5,5/2,5,3}
Coxeter diagram	
4-faces	{5,5/2,5}
Cells	{5,5/2}
Faces	{5}
Face figure	{3}
Edge figure	{5,3}
Vertex figure	{5/2,5,3}
Dual	Order-5 icosahedral 120-cell honeycomb
Coxeter group	H̅_{4}, [5,3,3,3]
Properties	Regular

In the geometry of hyperbolic 4-space, the great 120-cell honeycomb is one of four regular star-honeycombs. With Schläfli symbol {5,5/2,5,3}, it has three great 120-cells around each face. Acronym: gohitte

It is dual to the order-5 icosahedral 120-cell honeycomb.

It can be seen as a greatening of the 120-cell honeycomb, and is thus analogous to the three-dimensional great dodecahedron {5,5/2} and four-dimensional great 120-cell {5,5/2,5}. It has density 10.

== See also ==
- List of regular polytopes
