= 5-orthoplex honeycomb =

5-orthoplex honeycomb
(No image)
Type	Hyperbolic regular honeycomb
Schläfli symbol	{3,3,3,4,3}
Coxeter diagram	=
5-faces	{3,3,3,4}
4-faces	{3,3,3}
Cells	{3,3}
Faces	{3}
Cell figure	{3}
Face figure	{4,3}
Edge figure	{3,4,3}
Vertex figure	{3,3,4,3}
Dual	24-cell honeycomb honeycomb
Coxeter group	U̅_{5}, [3,3,3,4,3]
Properties	Regular

In the geometry of hyperbolic 5-space, the 5-orthoplex honeycomb is one of five paracompact regular space-filling tessellations (or honeycombs). It is paracompact because it has infinite vertex figures, with all vertices as ideal points at infinity. With Schläfli symbol {3,3,3,4,3}, it has three 5-orthoplexes around each cell. It is dual to the 24-cell honeycomb honeycomb.

== Related honeycombs ==
Its vertex figure is the 16-cell honeycomb, {3,3,4,3}.

== See also ==
- List of regular polytopes
