= Great snub icosidodecahedron =

Polyhedron with 92 faces

Great snub icosidodecahedron
| Type | Uniform star polyhedron |
| Elements | F = 92, E = 150; V = 60 (χ = 2) |
| Faces by sides | (20+60){3}+12{5/2} |
| Coxeter diagram | |
| Wythoff symbol | | 2 5/2 3 |
| Symmetry group | I, [5,3]^{+}, 532 |
| Index references | U_{57}, C_{88}, W_{113} |
| Dual polyhedron | Great pentagonal hexecontahedron |
| Vertex figure | 3^{4}.5/2 |
| Bowers acronym | Gosid |

3D model of a great snub icosidodecahedron

In geometry, the great snub icosidodecahedron is a nonconvex uniform polyhedron, indexed as U_{57}. It has 92 faces (80 triangles and 12 pentagrams), 150 edges, and 60 vertices. It can be represented by a Schläfli symbol sr{5/2,3}, and Coxeter-Dynkin diagram.

This polyhedron is the snub member of a family that includes the great icosahedron, the great stellated dodecahedron and the great icosidodecahedron.

In the book Polyhedron Models by Magnus Wenninger, the polyhedron is misnamed great inverted snub icosidodecahedron, and vice versa.

== Cartesian coordinates ==
Let $\xi\approx 0.3990206456527105$ be the positive zero of the polynomial $x^3+2x^2-\phi^{-2}$, where $\phi$ is the golden ratio. Let the point $p$ be given by

$$p=
\begin{pmatrix}
\xi \\
\phi^{-2}-\phi^{-2}\xi \\
-\phi^{-3}+\phi^{-1}\xi+2\phi^{-1}\xi^2
\end{pmatrix}$$.

Let the matrix $M$ be given by

$$M=
\begin{pmatrix}
1/2  & -\phi/2 & 1/(2\phi) \\
\phi/2   & 1/(2\phi)     & -1/2 \\
1/(2\phi)     & 1/2  & \phi/2
\end{pmatrix}$$.

$M$ is the rotation around the axis $(1, 0, \phi)$ by an angle of $2\pi/5$, counterclockwise. Let the linear transformations $T_0, \ldots, T_{11}$ be the transformations which send a point $(x, y, z)$ to the even permutations of $(\pm x, \pm y, \pm z)$ with an even number of minus signs. The transformations $T_i$ constitute the group of rotational symmetries of a regular tetrahedron. The transformations $T_i M^j$ $(i = 0,\ldots, 11$, $j = 0,\ldots, 4)$ constitute the group of rotational symmetries of a regular icosahedron. Then the 60 points $T_i M^j p$ are the vertices of a great snub icosahedron. The edge length equals $2\xi\sqrt{1-\xi}$, the circumradius equals $\xi\sqrt{2-\xi}$, and the midradius equals $\xi$.

For a great snub icosidodecahedron whose edge length is 1, the circumradius is

$$R = \frac12\sqrt{\frac{2-\xi}{1-\xi}} \approx 0.8160806747999234$$

Its midradius is

$$r=\frac{1}{2}\sqrt{\frac{1}{1-\xi}} \approx 0.6449710596467862$$

The four positive real roots of the sextic in R^{2},
$$4096R^{12} - 27648R^{10} + 47104R^8 - 35776R^6 + 13872R^4 - 2696R^2 + 209 = 0$$
are, in order, the circumradii of the great retrosnub icosidodecahedron (U_{74}), great snub icosidodecahedron (U_{57}), great inverted snub icosidodecahedron (U_{69}) and snub dodecahedron (U_{29}).

== Related polyhedra ==
=== Great pentagonal hexecontahedron ===
Great pentagonal hexecontahedron
| Type | Star polyhedron |
| Face | |
| Elements | F = 60, E = 150; V = 92 (χ = 2) |
| Symmetry group | I, [5,3]^{+}, 532 |
| Index references | DU_{57} |
| dual polyhedron | Great snub icosidodecahedron |

3D model of a great pentagonal hexecontahedron

The great pentagonal hexecontahedron (or great petaloid ditriacontahedron) is a nonconvex isohedral polyhedron and dual to the uniform great snub icosidodecahedron. It has 60 intersecting irregular pentagonal faces, 120 edges, and 92 vertices.

== Proportions ==
Denote the golden ratio by $\phi$. Let $\xi\approx -0.199\,510\,322\,83$ be the negative zero of the polynomial $P = 8x^3-8x^2+\phi^{-2}$. Then each pentagonal face has four equal angles of $\arccos(\xi)\approx 101.508\,325\,512\,64^{\circ}$ and one angle of $\arccos(-\phi^{-1}+\phi^{-2}\xi)\approx 133.966\,697\,949\,42^{\circ}$. Each face has three long and two short edges. The ratio $l$ between the lengths of the long and the short edges is given by

$$l = \frac{2-4\xi^2}{1-2\xi}\approx 1.315\,765\,089\,00$$.

The dihedral angle equals $\arccos(\xi/(\xi+1))\approx 104.432\,268\,611\,86^{\circ}$. Part of each face lies inside the solid, hence is invisible in solid models. The other two zeroes of the polynomial $P$ play a similar role in the description of the great inverted pentagonal hexecontahedron and the great pentagrammic hexecontahedron.

== See also ==
- List of uniform polyhedra
- Great inverted snub icosidodecahedron
- Great retrosnub icosidodecahedron
