= 24-cell honeycomb honeycomb =

24-cell honeycomb honeycomb
(No image)
Type	Hyperbolic regular honeycomb
Schläfli symbol	{3,4,3,3,3}
Coxeter diagram	=
5-faces	{3,4,3,3}
4-faces	{3,4,3}
Cells	{3,4}
Faces	{3}
Cell figure	{3}
Face figure	{3,3}
Edge figure	{3,3,3}
Vertex figure	{4,3,3,3}
Dual	5-orthoplex honeycomb
Coxeter group	U̅_{5}, [3,3,3,4,3]
Properties	Regular

In the geometry of hyperbolic 5-space, the 24-cell honeycomb honeycomb is one of five paracompact regular space-filling tessellations (or honeycombs). It is called paracompact because it has infinite facets, whose vertices exist on 4-horospheres and converge to a single ideal point at infinity. With Schläfli symbol {3,4,3,3,3}, it has three 24-cell honeycombs around each cell. It is dual to the 5-orthoplex honeycomb.

== Related honeycombs ==
It is related to the regular Euclidean 4-space 24-cell honeycomb, {3,4,3,3}, and the hyperbolic 5-space order-4 24-cell honeycomb honeycomb.

== See also ==
- List of regular polytopes
