= Serpentine curve =

Serpent-like curve

A serpentine curve is a curve whose Cartesian equation is of the form

$$x^2y+a^2y-abx=0, \quad ab > 0$$

Its functional representation is

$$y = \frac{abx}{x^2 + a^2}$$

Its parametric equation for $0 < t < \pi$ is

$$x=a\cot(t)$$
$$y=b\sin(t)\cos(t)$$

Its parametric equation for $-\pi / 2 < t < \pi / 2$ is

$$x=a\tan(t)$$
$$y=b\sin(t)\cos(t)$$

It has a maximum at $x = a$ and a minimum at $x = -a$, given that

$$y' = \frac{ab\left(a-x\right)\left(a-x\right)}{\left(a^2+x^2\right)^2} = 0$$

The minimum and maximum points are at $\pm b / 2$, which are independent of $a$.

The inflection points are at $x = \pm \sqrt{3}a$, given that

$$y'' = \frac{2abx\left(x^2 - 3a^2\right)}{\left(x^2+a^2\right)^3} = 0$$

In the parametric representation, its curvature is given by

$$\kappa(t) = -\frac{2ab \cot t \left(\cot^2 t - 3\right)}{\left(b^2 \cos^2 \left(2t\right) + a^2 \csc^4 4\right)^{3/2}}$$

An alternate parametric representation:

$$\kappa(t) = \frac{2abx\left(x^2 - 3a^2 \right)}{\left(x^2 + a^2 \right)^3 \left(1 + \frac{\left(a^3 b - abx^2\right)^2}{\left(x^2 + a^2\right)^4}\right)^{3/2}}$$

A generalization of the curve is given by the flipped curve when $a = 2$, resulting in the flipped curve equation

$$y^2\left(x^2+1\right)^2 = x^2$$

which is equivalent to a serpentine curve with the parameters $a = 1, b = \pm1$.

== History ==
L'Hôpital and Huygens had studied the curve in 1692, which was then named by Newton and classified as a cubic curve in 1701.

== Visual appearance ==
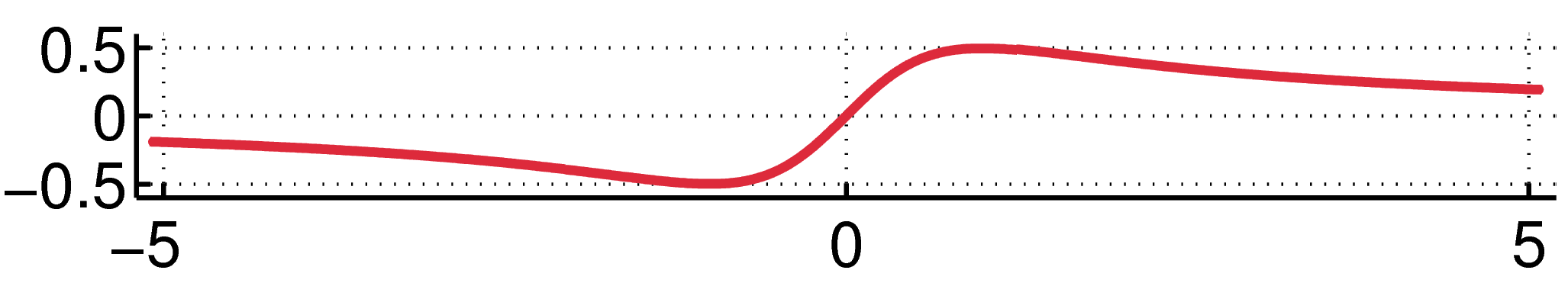
The serpentine curve for a = b = 1.
