= Rhombicosahedron =

Rhombicosahedron
Type	Uniform star polyhedron
Elements	F = 50, E = 120; V = 60 (χ = −10)
Faces by sides	30{4}+20{6}
Coxeter diagram	(with extra double-covered pentagrams) (with extra double-covered pentagons)
Wythoff symbol	2 3 (5/4 5/2) |
Symmetry group	I_{h}, [5,3], *532
Index references	U_{56}, C_{72}, W_{96}
Dual polyhedron	Rhombicosacron
Vertex figure	4.6.4/3.6/5
Bowers acronym	Ri

3D model of a rhombicosahedron

In geometry, the rhombicosahedron is a nonconvex uniform polyhedron, indexed as U_{56}. It has 50 faces (30 squares and 20 hexagons), 120 edges and 60 vertices. Its vertex figure is an antiparallelogram.

== Related polyhedra ==
A rhombicosahedron shares its vertex arrangement with the uniform compounds of 10 or 20 triangular prisms. It additionally shares its edges with the rhombidodecadodecahedron (having the square faces in common) and the icosidodecadodecahedron (having the hexagonal faces in common).

Convex hull	Rhombidodecadodecahedron	Icosidodecadodecahedron
Rhombicosahedron	Compound of ten triangular prisms	Compound of twenty triangular prisms

== Rhombicosacron ==
Rhombicosacron
Type	Star polyhedron
Face	
Elements	F = 60, E = 120; V = 50 (χ = −10)
Symmetry group	I_{h}, [5,3], *532
Index references	DU_{56}
dual polyhedron	Rhombicosahedron

3D model of a rhombicosacron

The rhombicosacron is a nonconvex isohedral polyhedron. It is the dual of the uniform rhombicosahedron, U_{56}. It has 50 vertices, 120 edges, and 60 crossed-quadrilateral faces.
