= Icosidodecadodecahedron =

Polyhedron with 44 faces

Icosidodecadodecahedron
| Type | Uniform star polyhedron |
| Elements | F = 44, E = 120; V = 60 (χ = −16) |
| Faces by sides | 12{5}+12{5/2}+20{6} |
| Coxeter diagram | |
| Wythoff symbol | 5/3 5 | 3; 5/2 5/4 | 3 |
| Symmetry group | I_{h}, [5,3], *532 |
| Index references | U_{44}, C_{56}, W_{83} |
| Dual polyhedron | Medial icosacronic hexecontahedron |
| Vertex figure | 5.6.5/3.6 |
| Bowers acronym | Ided |

3D model of an icosidodecadodecahedron

In geometry, the icosidodecadodecahedron (or icosified dodecadodecahedron) is a nonconvex uniform polyhedron, indexed as U_{44}. It has 44 faces (12 pentagons, 12 pentagrams and 20 hexagons), 120 edges and 60 vertices. Its vertex figure is a crossed quadrilateral.

== Related polyhedra ==
It shares its vertex arrangement with the uniform compounds of 10 or 20 triangular prisms. It additionally shares its edges with the rhombidodecadodecahedron (having the pentagonal and pentagrammic faces in common) and the rhombicosahedron (having the hexagonal faces in common).

| Convex hull | Rhombidodecadodecahedron | Icosidodecadodecahedron |
| Rhombicosahedron | Compound of ten triangular prisms | Compound of twenty triangular prisms |

== See also ==
- List of uniform polyhedra
- Snub icosidodecadodecahedron
