= Small hexagonal hexecontahedron =

Polyhedron with 60 faces

Small hexagonal hexecontahedron
Type	Star polyhedron
Face	
Elements	F = 60, E = 180; V = 112 (χ = −8)
Symmetry group	I_{h}, [5,3], *532
Index references	DU_{32}
dual polyhedron	Small snub icosicosidodecahedron

3D model of a small hexagonal hexecontahedron

In geometry, the small hexagonal hexecontahedron is a nonconvex isohedral polyhedron. It is the dual of the uniform small snub icosicosidodecahedron. It is partially degenerate, having coincident vertices, as its dual has coplanar triangular faces.

== Geometry ==
Treating it as a simple non-convex solid (without intersecting surfaces), it has 180 faces (all triangles), 270 edges, and 92 vertices (twelve with degree 10, twenty with degree 12, and sixty with degree 3), giving an Euler characteristic of 92 − 270 + 180 = +2.

== Faces ==
The faces are irregular hexagons. Denoting the golden ratio by $\phi$ and putting $\xi = \frac{1}{4}-\frac{1}{4}\sqrt{1+4\phi}\approx -0.433\,380\,199\,59$, the hexagons have five equal angles of $\arccos(\xi)\approx 115.682\,268\,170\,75^{\circ}$ and one of $\arccos(\phi^{-2}\xi-\phi^{-1})\approx 141.588\,659\,146\,23^{\circ}$. Each face has four long and two short edges. The ratio between the edge lengths is

$$1/2 +1/2\times\sqrt{(1-\xi)/(\phi^{3}-\xi)}\approx 0.777\,024\,337\,46$$.

The dihedral angle equals $\arccos(\xi/(1+\xi))\approx 139.893\,813\,264\,51^{\circ}$.

== Construction ==
Disregarding self-intersecting surfaces, the small hexagonal hexecontahedron can be constructed as a Kleetope of a pentakis dodecahedron. It is therefore a second order Kleetope of the regular dodecahedron. In other words, by adding a shallow pentagonal pyramid to each face of a regular dodecahedron, we get a pentakis dodecahedron. By adding an even shallower triangular pyramid to each face of the pentakis dodecahedron, we get a small hexagonal hexecontahedron.

The 60 vertices of degree 3 correspond to the apex vertex of each triangular pyramid of the Kleetope, or to each face of the pentakis dodecahedron. The 20 vertices of degree 12 and 12 vertices of degree 10 correspond to the vertices of the pentakis dodecahedron, and also respectively to the 20 hexagons and 12 pentagons of the truncated icosahedron, the dual solid to the pentakis dodecahedron.
