= Great pentagrammic hexecontahedron =

Polyhedron with 60 faces

Great pentagrammic hexecontahedron
| Type | Star polyhedron |
| Face | |
| Elements | F = 60, E = 150; V = 92 (χ = 2) |
| Symmetry group | I, [5,3]^{+}, 532 |
| Index references | DU_{74} |
| dual polyhedron | Great retrosnub icosidodecahedron |

In geometry, the great pentagrammic hexecontahedron (or great dentoid ditriacontahedron) is a nonconvex isohedral polyhedron. It is the dual of the great retrosnub icosidodecahedron. Its 60 faces are irregular pentagrams.

3D model of a great pentagrammic hexecontahedron

== Proportions ==
Denote the golden ratio by $\phi$. Let $\xi\approx 0.946\,730\,033\,56$ be the largest positive zero of the polynomial $P = 8x^3-8x^2+\phi^{-2}$. Then each pentagrammic face has four equal angles of $\arccos(\xi)\approx 18.785\,633\,958\,24^{\circ}$ and one angle of $\arccos(-\phi^{-1}+\phi^{-2}\xi)\approx 104.857\,464\,167\,03^{\circ}$. Each face has three long and two short edges. The ratio $l$ between the lengths of the long and the short edges is given by

$$l = \frac{2-4\xi^2}{1-2\xi}\approx 1.774\,215\,864\,94$$.

The dihedral angle equals $\arccos(\xi/(\xi+1))\approx 60.901\,133\,713\,21^{\circ}$. Part of each face lies inside the solid, hence is invisible in solid models. The other two zeroes of the polynomial $P$ play a similar role in the description of the great pentagonal hexecontahedron and the great inverted pentagonal hexecontahedron.
