= Order-4 120-cell honeycomb =

Order-4 120-cell honeycomb
(No image)
Type	Hyperbolic regular honeycomb
Schläfli symbol	{5,3,3,4} {5,3,3^{1,1}}
Coxeter diagram	=
4-faces	{5,3,3}
Cells	{5,3}
Faces	{5}
Face figure	{4}
Edge figure	{3,4}
Vertex figure	{3,3,4}
Dual	Order-5 tesseractic honeycomb
Coxeter group	B̅H̅_{4}, [5,3,3,4]
Properties	Regular

In the geometry of hyperbolic 4-space, the order-4 120-cell honeycomb is one of five compact regular space-filling tessellations (or honeycombs). With Schläfli symbol {5,3,3,4}, it has four 120-cells around each face. Acronym: shitte

Its dual is the order-5 tesseractic honeycomb, {4,3,3,5}.

== Related honeycombs ==
It is related to the (order-3) 120-cell honeycomb, and order-5 120-cell honeycomb.

== See also ==
- List of regular polytopes
