= Tesseractic honeycomb honeycomb =

Geometrical concept

Tesseractic honeycomb honeycomb
(No image)
Type	Hyperbolic regular honeycomb
Schläfli symbol	{4,3,3,4,3} {4,3,3^{1,1,1}}
Coxeter diagram	↔
5-faces	{4,3,3,4}
4-faces	{4,3,3}
Cells	{4,3}
Faces	{4}
Cell figure	{3}
Face figure	{4,3}
Edge figure	{3,4,3}
Vertex figure	{3,3,4,3}
Dual	Order-4 24-cell honeycomb honeycomb
Coxeter group	R̅_{5}, [3,4,3,3,4]
Properties	Regular

In the geometry of hyperbolic 5-space, the tesseractic honeycomb honeycomb is one of five paracompact regular space-filling tessellations (or honeycombs). It is called paracompact because it has infinite vertex figures, with all vertices as ideal points at infinity. With Schläfli symbol {4,3,3,4,3}, it has three tesseractic honeycombs around each cell. It is dual to the order-4 24-cell honeycomb honeycomb.

== Related honeycombs ==
It is related to the regular Euclidean 4-space tesseractic honeycomb, {4,3,3,4}.

It is analogous to the paracompact cubic honeycomb honeycomb, {4,3,4,3}, in 4-dimensional hyperbolic space, square tiling honeycomb, {4,4,3}, in 3-dimensional hyperbolic space, and the order-3 apeirogonal tiling, {∞,3} of 2-dimensional hyperbolic space, each with hypercube honeycomb facets.

== See also ==
- List of regular polytopes
