= Small nucleolar RNA SNORD38 =

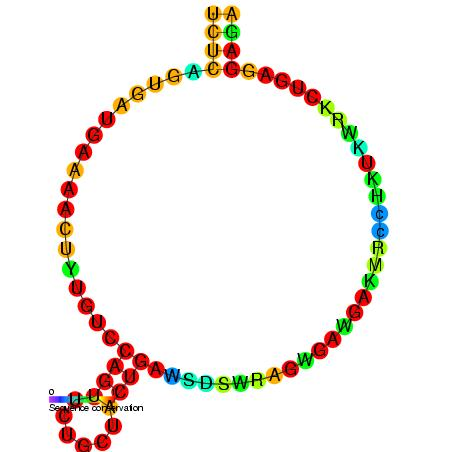
- Predicted secondary structure and sequence conservation of SNORD38

Identifiers
- Symbol: SNORD38
- Alt. Symbols: U38
- Rfam: RF00212

Other data
- RNA type: Gene; snRNA; snoRNA; C/D-box
- Domain: Eukaryota
- GO: GO:0006396 GO:0005730
- SO: SO:0000593
- PDB structures: PDBe

In molecular biology, snoRNA U38 (also known as SNORD38) is a non-coding RNA (ncRNA) molecule which functions in the modification of other small nuclear RNAs (snRNAs). This type of modifying RNA is usually located in the nucleolus of the eukaryotic cell which is a major site of snRNA biogenesis. It is known as a small nucleolar RNA (snoRNA) and also often referred to as a guide RNA.

snoRNA U38 belongs to the C/D box class of snoRNAs which contain the conserved sequence motifs known as the C box (UGAUGA) and the D box (CUGA). Most of the members of the box C/D family function in directing site-specific 2'-O-methylation of substrate RNAs.

U38 is located in introns 4 and 5 of ribosomal protein S8 in human and in the homologous genes in mouse and cow. U38 is predicted to guides the methylation of 2'-O-ribose residues in 28S ribosomal RNA (rRNA). The mouse homologue of U38 (MBII-329) has also been identified.
