= Compound of ten triangular prisms =

Polyhedral compound

Compound of ten triangular prisms
Type	Uniform compound
Index	UC_{32}
Polyhedra	10 triangular prisms
Faces	20 triangles, 30 squares
Edges	90
Vertices	60
Symmetry group	chiral icosahedral (I)
Subgroup restricting to one constituent	3-fold dihedral (D_{3})

This uniform polyhedron compound is a chiral symmetric arrangement of 10 triangular prisms, aligned with the axes of three-fold rotational symmetry of an icosahedron.

== Related polyhedra ==
This compound shares its vertex arrangement with three uniform polyhedra as follows:

convex hull	Rhombidodecadodecahedron	Icosidodecadodecahedron
Rhombicosahedron	Compound of ten triangular prisms	Compound of twenty triangular prisms
