= Rhombicosacron =

Polyhedron with 60 faces

Rhombicosacron
Type	Star polyhedron
Face	
Elements	F = 60, E = 120; V = 50 (χ = −10)
Symmetry group	I_{h}, [5,3], *532
Index references	DU_{56}
dual polyhedron	Rhombicosahedron

In geometry, the rhombicosacron (or midly dipteral ditriacontahedron) is a nonconvex isohedral polyhedron. It is the dual of the uniform rhombicosahedron, U56. It has 50 vertices, 120 edges, and 60 crossed-quadrilateral faces.

== Proportions ==
Each face has two angles of $\arccos(\frac{3}{4})\approx 41.409\,622\,109\,27^{\circ}$ and two angles of $\arccos(-\frac{1}{6})\approx 99.594\,068\,226\,86^{\circ}$. The diagonals of each antiparallelogram intersect at an angle of $\arccos(\frac{1}{8}+\frac{7\sqrt{5}}{24})\approx 38.996\,309\,663\,87^{\circ}$. The dihedral angle equals $\arccos(-\frac{5}{7})\approx 135.584\,691\,402\,81^{\circ}$. The ratio between the lengths of the long edges and the short ones equals $\frac{3}{2}+\frac{1}{2}\sqrt{5}$, which is the square of the golden ratio.
