= Cubic honeycomb honeycomb =

Cubic honeycomb honeycomb
(No image)
| Type | Hyperbolic regular honeycomb |
| Schläfli symbol | {4,3,4,3} {4,3^{1,1,1}} |
| Coxeter diagram | ↔ ↔ |
| 4-faces | {4,3,4} |
| Cells | {4,3} |
| Faces | {4} |
| Face figure | {3} |
| Edge figure | {4,3} |
| Vertex figure | {3,4,3} |
| Dual | Order-4 24-cell honeycomb |
| Coxeter group | R̅_{4}, [4,3,4,3] |
| Properties | Regular |

In the geometry of hyperbolic 4-space, the cubic honeycomb honeycomb is one of two paracompact regular space-filling tessellations (or honeycombs). It is called paracompact because it has infinite facets, whose vertices exist on 3-horospheres and converge to a single ideal point at infinity. With Schläfli symbol {4,3,4,3}, it has three cubic honeycombs around each face, and with a {3,4,3} vertex figure. Acronym: chont

It is dual to the order-4 24-cell honeycomb.

== Related honeycombs ==
It is related to the Euclidean 4-space 16-cell honeycomb, {3,3,4,3}, which also has a 24-cell vertex figure.

It is analogous to the paracompact tesseractic honeycomb honeycomb, {4,3,3,4,3}, in 5-dimensional hyperbolic space, square tiling honeycomb, {4,4,3}, in 3-dimensional hyperbolic space, and the order-3 apeirogonal tiling, {∞,3} of 2-dimensional hyperbolic space, each with hypercube honeycomb facets.

== See also ==
- List of regular polytopes
