= Medial hexagonal hexecontahedron =

Polyhedron with 60 faces

Medial hexagonal hexecontahedron
| Type | Star polyhedron |
| Face | |
| Elements | F = 60, E = 180; V = 104 (χ = −16) |
| Symmetry group | I, [5,3]^{+}, 532 |
| Index references | DU_{46} |
| dual polyhedron | Snub icosidodecadodecahedron |

3D model of a medial hexagonal hexecontahedron

In geometry, the medial hexagonal hexecontahedron (or midly dentoid ditriacontahedron) is a nonconvex isohedral polyhedron. It is the dual of the uniform snub icosidodecadodecahedron.

== Proportions ==
The faces of the medial hexagonal hexecontahedron are irregular nonconvex hexagons. Denote the golden ratio by $\phi$, and let $\xi\approx -0.377\,438\,833\,12$ be the real zero of the polynomial $8x^3-4x^2+1$. The number $\xi$ can be written as $\xi=-1/(2\rho)$, where $\rho$ is the plastic ratio. Then each face has four equal angles of $\arccos(\xi)\approx 112.175\,128\,045\,27^{\circ}$, one of $\arccos(\phi^2\xi+\phi)\approx 50.958\,265\,917\,31^{\circ}$ and one of $360^{\circ}-\arccos(\phi^{-2}\xi-\phi^{-1})\approx 220.341\,221\,901\,59^{\circ}$. Each face has two long edges, two of medium length and two short ones. If the medium edges have length $2$, the long ones have length $1+\sqrt{(1-\xi)/(-\phi^{-3}-\xi)}\approx 4.121\,448\,816\,41$ and the short ones $1-\sqrt{(1-\xi)/(\phi^{3}-\xi)}\approx 0.453\,587\,559\,98$. The dihedral angle equals $\arccos(\xi/(\xi+1))\approx 127.320\,132\,197\,62^{\circ}$.
