= Small snub icosicosidodecahedron =

Geometric figure

Small snub icosicosidodecahedron
Type	Uniform star polyhedron
Elements	F = 112, E = 180; V = 60 (χ = −8)
Faces by sides	(40+60){3}+12{5/2}
Coxeter diagram	
Wythoff symbol	| 5/2 3 3
Symmetry group	I_{h}, [5,3], *532
Index references	U_{32}, C_{41}, W_{110}
Dual polyhedron	Small hexagonal hexecontahedron
Vertex figure	3^{5}.5/2
Bowers acronym	Seside

3D model of a small snub icosicosidodecahedron

In geometry, the small snub icosicosidodecahedron or snub disicosidodecahedron is a uniform star polyhedron, indexed as U_{32}. It has 112 faces (100 triangles and 12 pentagrams), 180 edges, and 60 vertices. Its stellation core is a truncated pentakis dodecahedron. It also called a holosnub icosahedron, ß{3,5}.

The 40 non-snub triangular faces form 20 coplanar pairs, forming star hexagons that are not quite regular. Unlike most snub polyhedra, it has reflection symmetries.

== Convex hull ==
Its convex hull is a nonuniform truncated icosahedron.

Truncated icosahedron (regular faces)	Convex hull (isogonal hexagons)	Small snub icosicosidodecahedron

== Cartesian coordinates ==
Let $\xi=-\frac32+\frac12\sqrt{1+4\phi}\approx -0.1332396008261379$ be largest (least negative) zero of the polynomial $P=x^2+3x+\phi^{-2}$, where $\phi$ is the golden ratio. Equivalently, $\xi = -2+\sqrt{\phi + \sqrt{\phi + \sqrt{\phi + \cdots}}}\, = -2+\beta$ where $\beta \approx 1.86676039$ (OEIS: A275828) is a root of $\beta^2-\beta-\phi=0.$ Let the point $p$ be given by

$$p=
\begin{pmatrix}
\phi^{-1}\xi+\phi^{-3} \\
\xi \\
\phi^{-2}\xi+\phi^{-2}
\end{pmatrix}$$.

Let the matrix $M$ be given by

$$M=
\begin{pmatrix}
1/2  & -\phi/2 & 1/(2\phi) \\
\phi/2   & 1/(2\phi)     & -1/2 \\
1/(2\phi)     & 1/2  & \phi/2
\end{pmatrix}$$.

$M$ is the rotation around the axis $(1, 0, \phi)$ by an angle of $2\pi/5$, counterclockwise. Let the linear transformations $T_0, \ldots, T_{11}$ be the transformations which send a point $(x, y, z)$ to the even permutations of $(\pm x, \pm y, \pm z)$ with an even number of minus signs. The transformations $T_i$ constitute the group of rotational symmetries of a regular tetrahedron. The transformations $T_i M^j$ $(i = 0,\ldots, 11$, $j = 0,\ldots, 4)$ constitute the group of rotational symmetries of a regular icosahedron. Then the 60 points $T_i M^j p$ are the vertices of a small snub icosicosidodecahedron. The edge length equals $-2\xi$, the circumradius equals $\sqrt{-4\xi-\phi^{-2}}$, and the midradius equals $\sqrt{-\xi}$.

For a small snub icosicosidodecahedron whose edge length is 1, the circumradius is

$$R = \frac12\sqrt{\frac{\xi-1}{\xi}} \approx 1.4581903307387025$$

Its midradius is

$$r = \frac12\sqrt{\frac{-1}{\xi}} \approx 1.369787954633799$$

The other zero of $P$ plays a similar role in the description of the small retrosnub icosicosidodecahedron.

== See also ==
- List of uniform polyhedra
- Small retrosnub icosicosidodecahedron
