= Order-4 24-cell honeycomb =

Order-4 24-cell honeycomb
(No image)
Type	Hyperbolic regular honeycomb
Schläfli symbol	{3,4,3,4} {3,4,3^{1,1}}
Coxeter diagram	↔
4-faces	{3,4,3}
Cells	{3,4}
Faces	{3}
Face figure	{4}
Edge figure	{3,4}
Vertex figure	{4,3,4}
Dual	Cubic honeycomb honeycomb
Coxeter group	R̅_{4}, [4,3,4,3]
Properties	Regular

In the geometry of hyperbolic 4-space, the order-4 24-cell honeycomb is one of two paracompact regular space-filling tessellations (or honeycombs). It is called paracompact because it has infinite vertex figures, with all vertices as ideal points at infinity. With Schläfli symbol {3,4,3,4}, it has four 24-cells around each face. Acronym: n/a

It is dual to the cubic honeycomb honeycomb.

== Related honeycombs ==
It is related to the regular Euclidean 4-space 24-cell honeycomb, {3,4,3,3}, with 24-cell facets.

== See also ==
- List of regular polytopes
