= Great retrosnub icosidodecahedron =

Uniform star polyhedron

Great retrosnub icosidodecahedron
Type	Uniform star polyhedron
Elements	F = 92, E = 150; V = 60 (χ = 2)
Faces by sides	(20+60){3}+12{5/2}
Coxeter diagram	
Wythoff symbol	| 2 3/2 5/3
Symmetry group	I, [5,3]^{+}, 532
Index references	U_{74}, C_{90}, W_{117}
Dual polyhedron	Great pentagrammic hexecontahedron
Vertex figure	(3^{4}.5/2)/2
Bowers acronym	Girsid

3D model of a great retrosnub icosidodecahedron

In geometry, the great retrosnub icosidodecahedron or great inverted retrosnub icosidodecahedron is a nonconvex uniform polyhedron, indexed as U_{74}. It has 92 faces (80 triangles and 12 pentagrams), 150 edges, and 60 vertices. It is given a Schläfli symbol sr{3/2,5/3}.

== Cartesian coordinates ==
Let $\xi\approx -1.8934600671194555$ be the smallest (most negative) zero of the polynomial $x^3+2x^2-\phi^{-2}$, where $\phi$ is the golden ratio. Let the point $p$ be given by

$$p=
\begin{pmatrix}
\xi \\
\phi^{-2}-\phi^{-2}\xi \\
-\phi^{-3}+\phi^{-1}\xi+2\phi^{-1}\xi^2
\end{pmatrix}$$.

Let the matrix $M$ be given by

$$M=
\begin{pmatrix}
1/2  & -\phi/2 & 1/(2\phi) \\
\phi/2   & 1/(2\phi)     & -1/2 \\
1/(2\phi)     & 1/2  & \phi/2
\end{pmatrix}$$.

$M$ is the rotation around the axis $(1, 0, \phi)$ by an angle of $2\pi/5$, counterclockwise. Let the linear transformations $T_0, \ldots, T_{11}$ be the transformations which send a point $(x, y, z)$ to the even permutations of $(\pm x, \pm y, \pm z)$ with an even number of minus signs. The transformations $T_i$ constitute the group of rotational symmetries of a regular tetrahedron. The transformations $T_i M^j$ $(i = 0,\ldots, 11$, $j = 0,\ldots, 4)$ constitute the group of rotational symmetries of a regular icosahedron. Then the 60 points $T_i M^j p$ are the vertices of a great snub icosahedron. The edge length equals $-2\xi\sqrt{1-\xi}$, the circumradius equals $-\xi\sqrt{2-\xi}$, and the midradius equals $-\xi$.

For a great snub icosidodecahedron whose edge length is 1, the circumradius is

$$R = \frac12\sqrt{\frac{2-\xi}{1-\xi}} \approx 0.5800015046400155$$

Its midradius is

$$r=\frac{1}{2}\sqrt{\frac{1}{1-\xi}} \approx 0.2939417380786233$$

The four positive real roots of the sextic in R^{2},
$$4096R^{12} - 27648R^{10} + 47104R^8 - 35776R^6 + 13872R^4 - 2696R^2 + 209 = 0$$
are the circumradii of the snub dodecahedron (U_{29}), great snub icosidodecahedron (U_{57}), great inverted snub icosidodecahedron (U_{69}), and great retrosnub icosidodecahedron (U_{74}).

== See also ==
- List of uniform polyhedra
- Great snub icosidodecahedron
- Great inverted snub icosidodecahedron
