= Great truncated cuboctahedron =

Polyhedron with 26 faces

Great truncated cuboctahedron
Type	Uniform star polyhedron
Elements	F = 26, E = 72; V = 48 (χ = 2)
Faces by sides	12{4}+8{6}+6{8/3}
Coxeter diagram	
Wythoff symbol	2 3 4/3 |
Symmetry group	O_{h}, [4,3], *432
Index references	U_{20}, C_{67}, W_{93}
Dual polyhedron	Great disdyakis dodecahedron
Vertex figure	4.6/5.8/3
Bowers acronym	Quitco

3D model of a great truncated cuboctahedron

In geometry, the great truncated cuboctahedron (or quasitruncated cuboctahedron or stellatruncated cuboctahedron) is a nonconvex uniform polyhedron, indexed as U_{20}. It has 26 faces (12 squares, 8 hexagons and 6 octagrams), 72 edges, and 48 vertices. It is represented by the Schläfli symbol tr{^{4}/_{3},3}, and Coxeter-Dynkin diagram. It is sometimes called the quasitruncated cuboctahedron because it is related to the truncated cuboctahedron,, except that the octagonal faces are replaced by {^{8}/_{3}} octagrams.

== Convex hull ==
Its convex hull is a nonuniform truncated cuboctahedron. The truncated cuboctahedron and the great truncated cuboctahedron form isomorphic graphs despite their different geometric structure.

Convex hull	Great truncated cuboctahedron

== Orthographic projections ==
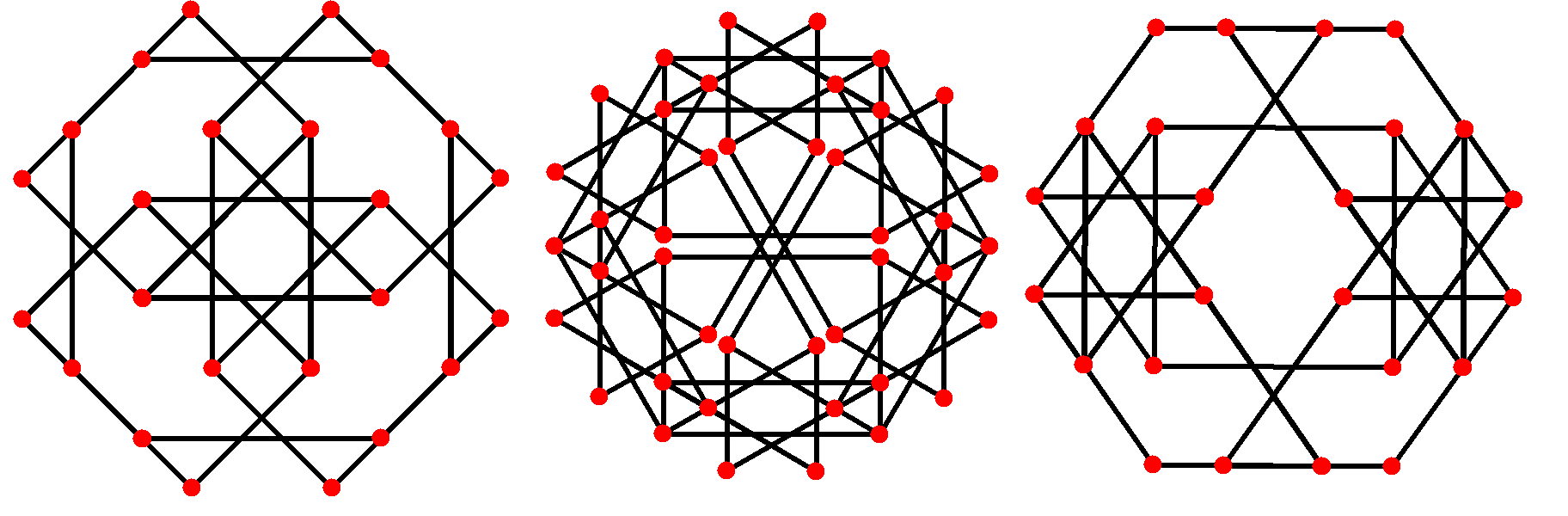

== Cartesian coordinates ==
Cartesian coordinates for the vertices of a great truncated cuboctahedron with side length 2 centered at the origin are all permutations of $\Bigl( \pm 1, \ \pm\left[1-\sqrt 2 \right], \ \pm\left[1-2\sqrt 2\right]\Bigr).$

== See also ==
- List of uniform polyhedra
