= Medial icosacronic hexecontahedron =

Polyhedron with 60 faces

Medial icosacronic hexecontahedron
Type	Star polyhedron
Face	
Elements	F = 60, E = 120; V = 44 (χ = −16)
Symmetry group	I_{h}, [5,3], *532
Index references	DU_{44}
dual polyhedron	Icosidodecadodecahedron

3D model of a medial icosacronic hexecontahedron

In geometry, the medial icosacronic hexecontahedron (or midly sagittal ditriacontahedron) is a nonconvex isohedral polyhedron. It is the dual of the uniform icosidodecadodecahedron. Its faces are darts. Part of each dart lies inside the solid, hence is invisible in solid models.

== Proportions ==
Faces have two angles of $\arccos(\frac{3}{4})\approx 41.409\,622\,109\,27^{\circ}$, one of $\arccos(-\frac{1}{8}+\frac{7}{24}\sqrt{5})\approx 58.184\,446\,117\,59^{\circ}$ and one of $360^{\circ}-\arccos(-\frac{1}{8}-\frac{7}{24}\sqrt{5})\approx 218.996\,309\,663\,87^{\circ}$. Its dihedral angles equal $\arccos(-\frac{5}{7})\approx 135.584\,691\,402\,81^{\circ}$. The ratio between the lengths of the long and short edges is $\frac{27+7\sqrt{5}}{22}\approx 1.938\,748\,901\,93$.
