= Great inverted snub icosidodecahedron =

Polyhedron with 92 faces

Great inverted snub icosidodecahedron
Type	Uniform star polyhedron
Elements	F = 92, E = 150; V = 60 (χ = 2)
Faces by sides	(20+60){3}+12{5/2}
Coxeter diagram	
Wythoff symbol	| 5/3 2 3
Symmetry group	I, [5,3]^{+}, 532
Index references	U_{69}, C_{73}, W_{116}
Dual polyhedron	Great inverted pentagonal hexecontahedron
Vertex figure	3^{4}.5/3
Bowers acronym	Gisid

3D model of a great inverted snub icosidodecahedron

In geometry, the great inverted snub icosidodecahedron (or great vertisnub icosidodecahedron) is a uniform star polyhedron, indexed as U_{69}. It is given a Schläfli symbol sr{5/3,3}, and Coxeter-Dynkin diagram. In the book Polyhedron Models by Magnus Wenninger, the polyhedron is misnamed great snub icosidodecahedron, and vice versa.

== Cartesian coordinates ==
Let $\xi\approx -0.5055605785332548$ be the largest (least negative) negative zero of the polynomial $x^3+2x^2-\phi^{-2}$, where $\phi$ is the golden ratio. Let the point $p$ be given by

$$p=
\begin{pmatrix}
\xi \\
\phi^{-2}-\phi^{-2}\xi \\
-\phi^{-3}+\phi^{-1}\xi+2\phi^{-1}\xi^2
\end{pmatrix}$$.

Let the matrix $M$ be given by

$$M=
\begin{pmatrix}
1/2  & -\phi/2 & 1/(2\phi) \\
\phi/2   & 1/(2\phi)     & -1/2 \\
1/(2\phi)     & 1/2  & \phi/2
\end{pmatrix}$$.

$M$ is the rotation around the axis $(1, 0, \phi)$ by an angle of $2\pi/5$, counterclockwise. Let the linear transformations $T_0, \ldots, T_{11}$ be the transformations which send a point $(x, y, z)$ to the even permutations of $(\pm x, \pm y, \pm z)$ with an even number of minus signs. The transformations $T_i$ constitute the group of rotational symmetries of a regular tetrahedron. The transformations $T_i M^j$ $(i = 0,\ldots, 11$, $j = 0,\ldots, 4)$ constitute the group of rotational symmetries of a regular icosahedron. Then the 60 points $T_i M^j p$ are the vertices of a great snub icosahedron. The edge length equals $-2\xi\sqrt{1-\xi}$, the circumradius equals $-\xi\sqrt{2-\xi}$, and the midradius equals $-\xi$.

For a great snub icosidodecahedron whose edge length is 1, the circumradius is

$$R = \frac12\sqrt{\frac{2-\xi}{1-\xi}} \approx 0.6450202372957795$$

Its midradius is

$$r=\frac{1}{2}\sqrt{\frac{1}{1-\xi}} \approx 0.4074936889340787$$

The four positive real roots of the sextic in R^{2},
$$4096R^{12} - 27648R^{10} + 47104R^8 - 35776R^6 + 13872R^4 - 2696R^2 + 209 = 0$$
are the circumradii of the snub dodecahedron (U_{29}), great snub icosidodecahedron (U_{57}), great inverted snub icosidodecahedron (U_{69}), and great retrosnub icosidodecahedron (U_{74}).

== Related polyhedra ==
=== Great inverted pentagonal hexecontahedron ===
Great inverted pentagonal hexecontahedron
Type	Star polyhedron
Face	
Elements	F = 60, E = 150; V = 92 (χ = 2)
Symmetry group	I, [5,3]^{+}, 532
Index references	DU_{69}
dual polyhedron	Great inverted snub icosidodecahedron

3D model of a great inverted pentagonal hexecontahedron

The great inverted pentagonal hexecontahedron (or petaloidal trisicosahedron) is a nonconvex isohedral polyhedron. It is composed of 60 concave pentagonal faces, 150 edges and 92 vertices.

It is the dual of the uniform great inverted snub icosidodecahedron.

== Proportions ==
Denote the golden ratio by $\phi$. Let $\xi\approx 0.252\,780\,289\,27$ be the smallest positive zero of the polynomial $P = 8x^3-8x^2+\phi^{-2}$. Then each pentagonal face has four equal angles of $\arccos(\xi)\approx 75.357\,903\,417\,42^{\circ}$ and one angle of $360^{\circ}-\arccos(-\phi^{-1}+\phi^{-2}\xi)\approx 238.568\,386\,330\,33^{\circ}$. Each face has three long and two short edges. The ratio $l$ between the lengths of the long and the short edges is given by

$$l = \frac{2-4\xi^2}{1-2\xi}\approx 3.528\,053\,034\,81$$.

The dihedral angle equals $\arccos(\xi/(\xi+1))\approx 78.359\,199\,060\,62^{\circ}$. Part of each face lies inside the solid, hence is invisible in solid models. The other two zeroes of the polynomial $P$ play a similar role in the description of the great pentagonal hexecontahedron and the great pentagrammic hexecontahedron.

== See also ==
- List of uniform polyhedra
- Great snub icosidodecahedron
- Great retrosnub icosidodecahedron
