= Medial deltoidal hexecontahedron =

Polyhedron with 60 faces

Medial deltoidal hexecontahedron
Type	Star polyhedron
Face	
Elements	F = 60, E = 120; V = 54 (χ = −6)
Symmetry group	I_{h}, [5,3], *532
Index references	DU_{38}
dual polyhedron	Rhombidodecadodecahedron

3D model of a medial deltoidal hexecontahedron

In geometry, the medial deltoidal hexecontahedron is a nonconvex isohedral polyhedron. It is the dual of the rhombidodecadodecahedron. Its 60 intersecting quadrilateral faces are kites.

== Proportions ==
The kites have two angles of $\arccos(\frac{1}{6})\approx 80.405\,931\,773\,14^{\circ}$, one of $\arccos(-\frac{1}{8}+\frac{7}{24}\sqrt{5})\approx 58.184\,446\,117\,59^{\circ}$ and one of $\arccos(-\frac{1}{8}-\frac{7}{24}\sqrt{5})\approx 141.003\,690\,336\,13^{\circ}$. The dihedral angle equals $\arccos(-\frac{5}{7})\approx 135.584\,691\,402\,81^{\circ}$. The ratio between the lengths of the long and short edges is $\frac{27+7\sqrt{5}}{22}\approx 1.938\,748\,901\,931\,75$. Part of each kite lies inside the solid, hence is invisible in solid models.
