= Small retrosnub icosicosidodecahedron =

Uniform star polyhedron with 112 faces

Small retrosnub icosicosidodecahedron
Type	Uniform star polyhedron
Elements	F = 112, E = 180; V = 60 (χ = −8)
Faces by sides	(40+60){3}+12{5/2}
Coxeter diagram	
Wythoff symbol	| 3/2 3/2 5/2
Symmetry group	I_{h}, [5,3], *532
Index references	U_{72}, C_{91}, W_{118}
Dual polyhedron	Small hexagrammic hexecontahedron
Vertex figure	(3^{5}.5/3)/2
Bowers acronym	Sirsid

3D model of a small retrosnub icosicosidodecahedron

In geometry, the small retrosnub icosicosidodecahedron (also known as a retrosnub disicosidodecahedron, small inverted retrosnub icosicosidodecahedron, or retroholosnub icosahedron) is a nonconvex uniform polyhedron, indexed as U_{72}. It has 112 faces (100 triangles and 12 pentagrams), 180 edges, and 60 vertices. It is given a Schläfli symbol sr{⁵/₃,³/₂}.

The 40 non-snub triangular faces form 20 coplanar pairs, forming star hexagons that are not quite regular. Unlike most snub polyhedra, it has reflection symmetries.

George Olshevsky nicknamed it the yog-sothoth (after the Cthulhu Mythos deity).

== Convex hull ==
Its convex hull is a nonuniform truncated dodecahedron.

Truncated dodecahedron	Convex hull	Small retrosnub icosicosidodecahedron

== Cartesian coordinates ==
Let $\xi=-\frac32-\frac12\sqrt{1+4\phi}\approx -2.86676039917$ be the smallest (most negative) zero of the polynomial $P=x^2+3x+\phi^{-2}$, where $\phi$ is the golden ratio. Equivalently, $\xi = -1-\sqrt{\phi + \sqrt{\phi + \sqrt{\phi + \cdots}}}\, = -1-\beta$ where $\beta \approx 1.86676039917$ (OEIS: A275828) is a root of $\beta^2-\beta-\phi=0.$ Let the point $p$ be given by

$$p=
\begin{pmatrix}
\phi^{-1}\xi+\phi^{-3} \\
\xi \\
\phi^{-2}\xi+\phi^{-2}
\end{pmatrix}$$.

Let the matrix $M$ be given by

$$M=
\begin{pmatrix}
1/2  & -\phi/2 & 1/(2\phi) \\
\phi/2   & 1/(2\phi)     & -1/2 \\
1/(2\phi)     & 1/2  & \phi/2
\end{pmatrix}$$.

$M$ is the rotation around the axis $(1, 0, \phi)$ by an angle of $2\pi/5$, counterclockwise. Let the linear transformations $T_0, \ldots, T_{11}$ be the transformations which send a point $(x, y, z)$ to the even permutations of $(\pm x, \pm y, \pm z)$ with an even number of minus signs. The transformations $T_i$ constitute the group of rotational symmetries of a regular tetrahedron. The transformations $T_i M^j$ $(i = 0,\ldots, 11$, $j = 0,\ldots, 4)$ constitute the group of rotational symmetries of a regular icosahedron. Then the 60 points $T_i M^j p$ are the vertices of a small snub icosicosidodecahedron. The edge length equals $-2\xi$, the circumradius equals $\sqrt{-4\xi-\phi^{-2}}$, and the midradius equals $\sqrt{-\xi}$.

For a small snub icosicosidodecahedron whose edge length is 1, the circumradius is

$$R = \frac12\sqrt{\frac{\xi-1}{\xi}} \approx 0.5806948001339209$$

Its midradius is

$$r = \frac12\sqrt{\frac{-1}{\xi}} \approx 0.2953073837589815$$

The other zero of $P$ plays a similar role in the description of the small snub icosicosidodecahedron.

== See also ==
- List of uniform polyhedra
- Small snub icosicosidodecahedron
