= Great disdyakis dodecahedron =

Polyhedron with 48 faces

Great disdyakis dodecahedron
Type	Star polyhedron
Face	
Elements	F = 48, E = 72; V = 26 (χ = 2)
Symmetry group	O_{h}, [4,3], *432
Index references	DU_{20}
dual polyhedron	Great truncated cuboctahedron

3D model of a great disdyakis dodecahedron

In geometry, the great disdyakis dodecahedron is a nonconvex isohedral polyhedron. It is the dual of the uniform great truncated cuboctahedron. It has 48 triangular faces.

== Proportions ==
The triangles have one angle of $\arccos(\frac{3}{4}+\frac{1}{8}\sqrt{2})\approx 22.062\,191\,157\,54^{\circ}$, one of $\arccos(-\frac{1}{6}-\frac{1}{12}\sqrt{2})\approx 106.530\,027\,150\,22^{\circ}$ and one of $\arccos(-\frac{1}{12}+\frac{1}{2}\sqrt{2})\approx 51.407\,781\,692\,24^{\circ}$. The dihedral angle equals $\arccos(\frac{-71+12\sqrt{2}}{97})\approx 123.848\,891\,579\,44^{\circ}$.

== Related polyhedra ==
The great disdyakis dodecahedron is topologically identical to the convex Catalan solid, disdyakis dodecahedron, which is dual to the truncated cuboctahedron.

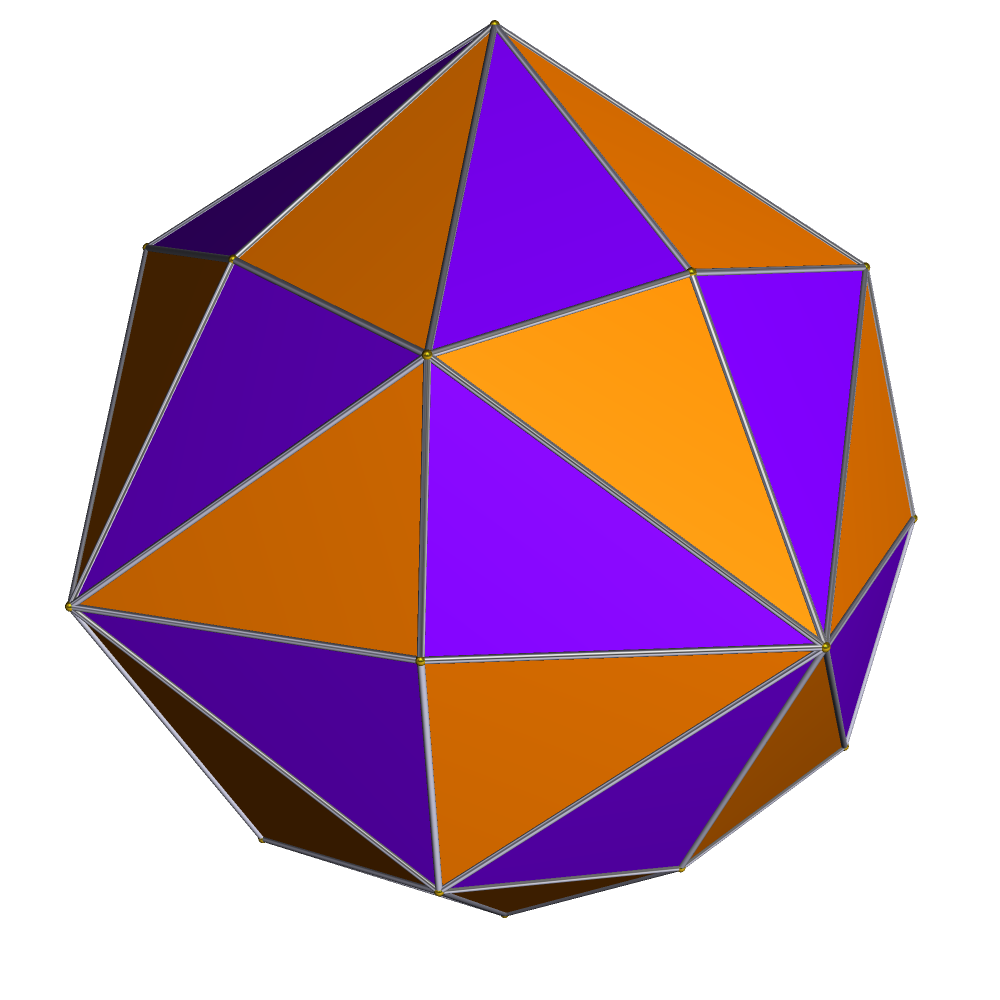
