= Small nucleolar RNA SNORD46 =

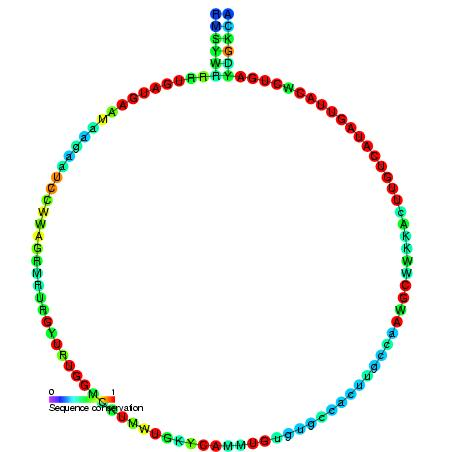
- Predicted secondary structure and sequence conservation of SNORD46

Identifiers
- Symbol: SNORD46
- Alt. Symbols: U40
- Rfam: RF00218

Other data
- RNA type: Gene; snRNA; snoRNA; C/D-box
- Domain: Eukaryota
- GO: GO:0006396 GO:0005730
- SO: SO:0000593
- PDB structures: PDBe

In molecular biology, snoRNA U46 (also known as SNORD46) is a non-coding RNA (ncRNA) molecule which functions in the modification of other small nuclear RNAs (snRNAs). This type of modifying RNA is usually located in the nucleolus of the eukaryotic cell which is a major site of snRNA biogenesis. It is known as a small nucleolar RNA (snoRNA) and also often referred to as a guide RNA.

snoRNA U46 belongs to the C/D box class of snoRNAs which contain the conserved sequence motifs known as the C box (UGAUGA) and the D box (CUGA). Most of the members of the box C/D family function in directing site-specific 2'-O-methylation of substrate RNAs.

U46 is encoded in intron 2 of the ribosomal protein S8 gene in human, and is hypothesised to guide methylation of 2'-O-ribose residues on 28S ribosomal RNA (rRNA). The homologue of this snoRNA in Arabidopsis thaliana is called snoZ153. Some human U40 sequences have been annotated in the sequence databases (Genbank) as U46.
