= Small hexagrammic hexecontahedron =

Polyhedron with 60 faces

Small hexagrammic hexecontahedron
Type	Star polyhedron
Face	
Elements	F = 60, E = 180; V = 112 (χ = −8)
Symmetry group	I_{h}, [5,3], *532
Index references	DU_{72}
dual polyhedron	Small retrosnub icosicosidodecahedron

3D model of a small hexagrammic hexecontahedron

In geometry, the small hexagrammic hexecontahedron is a nonconvex isohedral polyhedron. It is the dual of the small retrosnub icosicosidodecahedron. It is partially degenerate, having coincident vertices, as its dual has coplanar triangular faces.

== Geometry ==
Its faces are hexagonal stars with two short and four long edges. Denoting the golden ratio by $\phi$ and putting $\xi = \frac{1}{4}+\frac{1}{4}\sqrt{1+4\phi}\approx 0.933\,380\,199\,59$, the stars have five equal angles of $\arccos(\xi)\approx 21.031\,988\,967\,51^{\circ}$ and one of $360^{\circ}-\arccos(\phi^{-2}\xi-\phi^{-1})\approx 254.840\,055\,162\,43^{\circ}$. Each face has four long and two short edges. The ratio between the edge lengths is

$$1/2 -1/2\times\sqrt{(1-\xi)/(\phi^{3}-\xi)}\approx 0.428\,986\,992\,12$$.

The dihedral angle equals $\arccos(\xi/(1+\xi))\approx 61.133\,452\,273\,64^{\circ}$. Part of each face is inside the solid, hence is not visible in solid models.
