= Compound of two snub dodecahedra =

Polyhedral compound

Compound of two snub dodecahedra
Type	Uniform compound
Index	UC_{69}
Schläfli symbol	βr{5,3}
Coxeter diagram	
Polyhedra	2 snub dodecahedra
Faces	40+120 triangles, 24 pentagons
Edges	300
Vertices	120
Symmetry group	icosahedral (I_{h})
Subgroup restricting to one constituent	chiral icosahedral (I)

This uniform polyhedron compound is a composition of the 2 enantiomers of the snub dodecahedron.

The vertex arrangement of this compound is shared by a convex nonuniform truncated icosidodecahedron, with rectangular faces, alongside irregular hexagons and decagons, each alternating two different edge lengths.

Together with its convex hull, it represents the snub dodecahedron-first projection of the nonuniform snub dodecahedral antiprism.

== See also ==
- Compound of two icosahedra
- Compound of two snub cubes
