= 120-cell honeycomb =

5-dimensional regular honeycomb

120-cell honeycomb
(No image)
Type	Hyperbolic regular honeycomb
Schläfli symbol	{5,3,3,3}
Coxeter diagram	
4-faces	{5,3,3}
Cells	{5,3}
Faces	{5}
Face figure	{3}
Edge figure	{3,3}
Vertex figure	{3,3,3}
Dual	Order-5 5-cell honeycomb
Coxeter group	H̅_{4}, [5,3,3,3]
Properties	Regular

In the geometry of hyperbolic 4-space, the 120-cell honeycomb is one of five compact regular space-filling tessellations (or honeycombs). With Schläfli symbol {5,3,3,3}, it has three 120-cells around each face. Acronym: hitte

Its dual is the order-5 5-cell honeycomb, {3,3,3,5}.

== Related honeycombs ==
It is related to the order-4 120-cell honeycomb, {5,3,3,4}, and order-5 120-cell honeycomb, {5,3,3,5}.

It is topologically similar to the finite 5-cube, {4,3,3,3}, and 5-simplex, {3,3,3,3}.

It is analogous to the 120-cell, {5,3,3}, and dodecahedron, {5,3}.

== See also ==
- List of regular polytopes
- Great 120-cell honeycomb
