= Snub icosidodecadodecahedron =

Polyhedron with 104 faces

Snub icosidodecadodecahedron
Type	Uniform star polyhedron
Elements	F = 104, E = 180; V = 60 (χ = −16)
Faces by sides	(20+60){3}+12{5}+12{5/2}
Coxeter diagram	
Wythoff symbol	| 5/3 3 5
Symmetry group	I, [5,3]^{+}, 532
Index references	U_{46}, C_{58}, W_{112}
Dual polyhedron	Medial hexagonal hexecontahedron
Vertex figure	3.3.3.5.3.5/3
Bowers acronym	Sided

3D model of a snub icosidodecadodecahedron

In geometry, the snub icosidodecadodecahedron is a nonconvex uniform polyhedron, indexed as U_{46}. It has 104 faces (80 triangles, 12 pentagons, and 12 pentagrams), 180 edges, and 60 vertices. As the name indicates, it belongs to the family of snub polyhedra.

== Cartesian coordinates ==
Let $\rho=$ 1.324717957244746... be the real zero of the polynomial $x^3-x-1$. The constant $\rho$ is known as the plastic ratio. Denote by $\phi=$ 1.618033988749894... the golden ratio.

Let the point $p$ be given by
$$p=
\begin{pmatrix}
\rho \\
(\phi-\rho)/(\rho+1) \\
(\rho-\phi)/ \rho
\end{pmatrix}$$
Let the matrix $M$ be given by
$$M=
\begin{pmatrix}
1/2 & -\phi/2 & 1/(2\phi) \\
\phi/2 & 1/(2\phi) & -1/2 \\
1/(2\phi) & 1/2 & \phi/2
\end{pmatrix}$$

$M$ is the rotation around the axis $(1, 0, \phi)$ by an angle of $2\pi/5$, counterclockwise. Let the linear transformations $T_0, \ldots, T_{11}$ be the transformations which send a point $(x, y, z)$ to the even permutations of $(\pm x, \pm y, \pm z)$ with an even number of minus signs. The transformations $T_i$ constitute the group of rotational symmetries of a regular tetrahedron. The transformations $T_i M^j$ $(i = 0,\ldots, 11$, $j = 0,\ldots, 4)$ constitute the group of rotational symmetries of a regular icosahedron. Then the 60 points $T_i M^j p$ are the vertices of a snub icosidodecadodecahedron.

The edge length $\lambda =2\sqrt{(\rho^5 -\phi^2) \rho^{-5}}$, the circumradius equals $\sqrt{(\rho^5-\phi^2)(1 +\rho^{-5})},$ and the midradius $\sqrt{\rho^5-\phi^2}.$ To get a snub icosidodecadodecahedron with unit edge length, divide all above coordinates by $\lambda$.

== Properties ==
The snub icosidodecadodecahedron was among the ten snub polyhedra discovered by Coxeter and Miller in the early 1930's, but published only in 1954. Its equation is in Table 4 of Uniform polyhedra.

The measures listed on David McCooey's Visual Polyhedra can be written in terms of $\sqrt{5}$ and plastic constant $\rho$.

The snub icosidodecadodecahedron of unit edge length
element	size
circumscribed radius	$R =\tfrac12 \sqrt{\rho^5 +1}$
midscribed radius	$r =\tfrac12 \sqrt{\rho^5}$
pentagon center radius	$r_5 =\tfrac12 \sqrt{\rho^4 -\tfrac{2}{\sqrt{5}} }$
triangle center radius	$r_3 =\tfrac12 \sqrt{\rho^5 -\tfrac13 }$
pentagram center radius	$r_{\tfrac53} =-\tfrac12 \sqrt{\rho^4 +\tfrac{2}{\sqrt{5}} }$
triangle-triangle angle	$\alpha_{33} =\arccos\left( \tfrac13 (1 -2\rho^2) \right)$
pentagram-triangle angle	$\alpha_{\tfrac53 3} =\arccos\left( \sqrt{\tfrac13 (u -v)} \right)$
pentagon-triangle angle	$\alpha_{53} =\arccos\left( -\sqrt{\tfrac13 (u +v)} \right)$

With $u =2\rho^2 -2\rho +1,$ $v =(\rho^2 -3\rho +1) \tfrac{2}{\sqrt{5}}.$

McCooey's metrics panel gives volume 4.620684..., but no formula. However, this solution (see Answer) is correct.

== Graph ==
The skeleton of a snub icosidodecadodecahedron can be represented as a graph with 60 vertices and 180 edges, an Eulerian graph.

== Related polyhedra ==
=== Medial hexagonal hexecontahedron ===
Medial hexagonal hexecontahedron
Type	Star polyhedron
Face	
Elements	F = 60, E = 180; V = 104 (χ = −16)
Symmetry group	I, [5,3]^{+}, 532
Index references	DU_{46}
dual polyhedron	Snub icosidodecadodecahedron

The medial hexagonal hexecontahedron is a nonconvex isohedral polyhedron. It is the dual of the uniform snub icosidodecadodecahedron.

== See also ==
- Snubs Jonathan Bowers
- Uniform snubs Robert Ferréol
- Sided Richard Klitzing
- List of uniform polyhedra
