= Compound of two snub cubes =

Polyhedral compound

Compound of two snub cubes
Type	Uniform compound
Index	UC_{68}
Schläfli symbol	βr{4,3}
Coxeter diagram	
Polyhedra	2 snub cubes
Faces	16+48 triangles 12 squares
Edges	120
Vertices	48
Symmetry group	octahedral (O_{h})
Subgroup restricting to one constituent	chiral octahedral (O)

This uniform polyhedron compound is a composition of the 2 enantiomers of the snub cube. As a holosnub, it is represented by Schläfli symbol βr{4,3} and Coxeter diagram.

The vertex arrangement of this compound is shared by a convex nonuniform truncated cuboctahedron, having rectangular faces, alongside irregular hexagons and octagons, each alternating with two edge lengths.

Together with its convex hull, it represents the snub cube-first projection of the nonuniform snub cubic antiprism.

== Cartesian coordinates ==
Cartesian coordinates for the vertices are all the permutations of

(±1, ±ξ, ±1/ξ)

where ξ is the real solution to

$$\xi^3+\xi^2+\xi=1, \,$$

which can be written

$$\xi = \frac{1}{3}\left(\sqrt[3]{17+3\sqrt{33}} - \sqrt[3]{-17+3\sqrt{33}} - 1\right)$$

or approximately 0.543689. ξ is the reciprocal of the tribonacci constant.

Equally, the tribonacci constant, t, just like the snub cube, can compute the coordinates as the permutations of:

(±1, ±1/t, ±t)

== Truncated cuboctahedron ==
This compound can be seen as the union of the two chiral alternations of a truncated cuboctahedron:

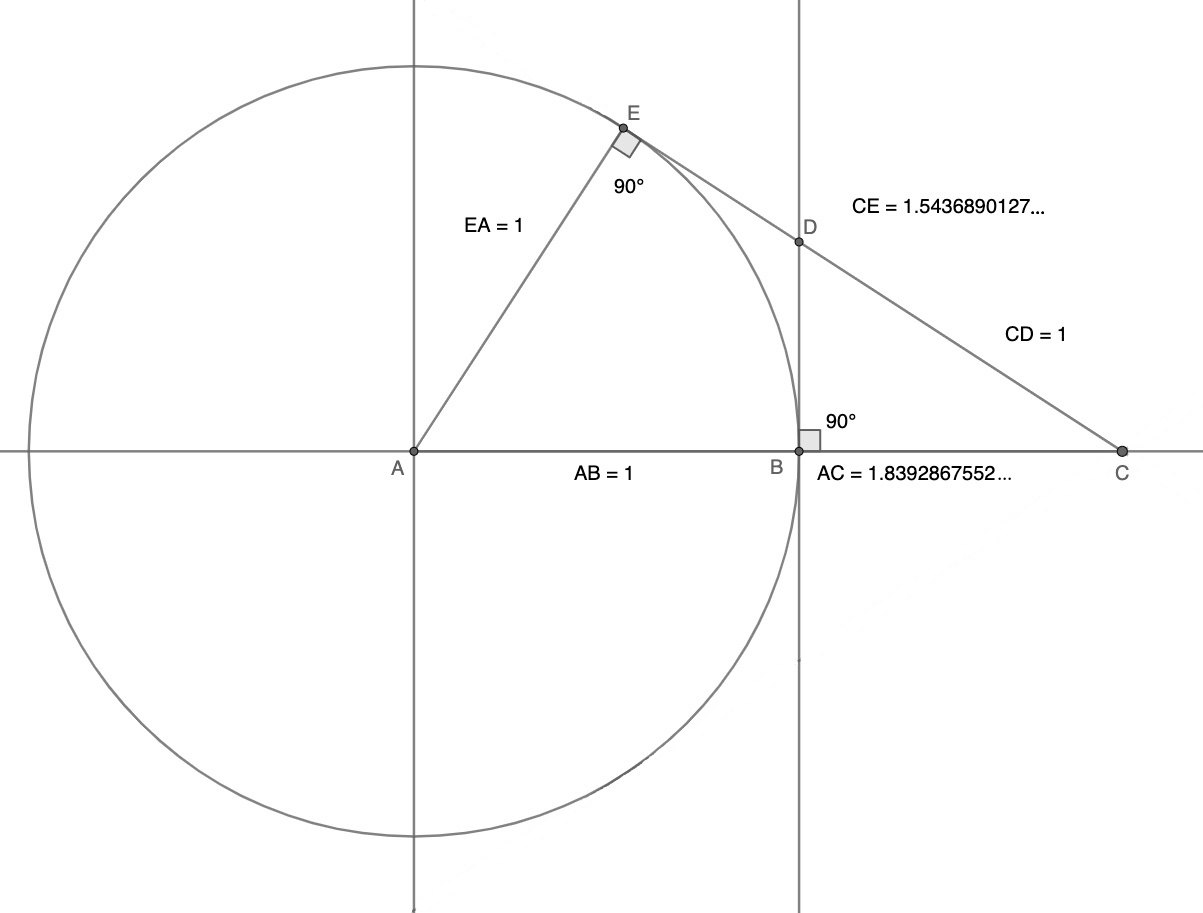
A geometric construction of the Tribonacci constant (AC), with compass and marked ruler, according to the method described by Xerardo Neira.

== See also ==
- Compound of two icosahedra
- Compound of two snub dodecahedra
- Snub (geometry)
