= Order-5 120-cell honeycomb =

5-dimensional regular honeycomb

Order-5 120-cell honeycomb
(No image)
| Type | Hyperbolic regular honeycomb |
| Schläfli symbol | {5,3,3,5} |
| Coxeter diagram | |
| 4-faces | {5,3,3} |
| Cells | {5,3} |
| Faces | {5} |
| Face figure | {5} |
| Edge figure | {3,5} |
| Vertex figure | {3,3,5} |
| Dual | Self-dual |
| Coxeter group | K̅_{4}, [5,3,3,5] |
| Properties | Regular |

In the geometry of hyperbolic 4-space, the order-5 120-cell honeycomb is one of five compact regular space-filling tessellations (or honeycombs). With Schläfli symbol {5,3,3,5}, it has five 120-cells around each face. Acronym: phitte

It is self-dual. It also has 600 120-cells around each vertex.

== Related honeycombs ==
It is related to the (order-3) 120-cell honeycomb, and order-4 120-cell honeycomb. It is analogous to the order-5 dodecahedral honeycomb and order-5 pentagonal tiling.

== Birectified order-5 120-cell honeycomb ==
The birectified order-5 120-cell honeycomb constructed by all rectified 600-cells, with octahedron and icosahedron cells, and triangle faces with a 5-5 duoprism vertex figure and has extended symmetry [[5,3,3,5]].

== See also ==
- List of regular polytopes
