= Bullet-nose curve =

Quartic plane curve

Bullet-nose curve with a = 1 and b = 1

In mathematics, a bullet-nose curve is a unicursal quartic curve with three inflection points, given by the equation

$a^2y^2-b^2x^2=x^2y^2 \,$

The bullet curve has three double points in the real projective plane, at x = 0 and y = 0, x = 0 and z = 0, and y = 0 and z = 0, and is therefore a unicursal (rational) curve of genus zero.

If

$$f(z) = \sum_{n=0}^{\infty} {2n \choose n} z^{2n+1} = z+2z^3+6z^5+20z^7+\cdots$$

then

$$y = f\left(\frac{x}{2a}\right)\pm 2b\$$

are the two branches of the bullet curve at the origin.
