= Compound of two icosahedra =

Polyhedral compound

Compound of two icosahedra
Type	Uniform compound
Index	UC_{46}
Schläfli symbols	β{3,4} βr{3,3}
Coxeter diagrams	
Polyhedra	2 icosahedra
Faces	16+24 triangles
Edges	60
Vertices	24
Symmetry group	octahedral (O_{h})
Subgroup restricting to one constituent	pyritohedral (T_{h})

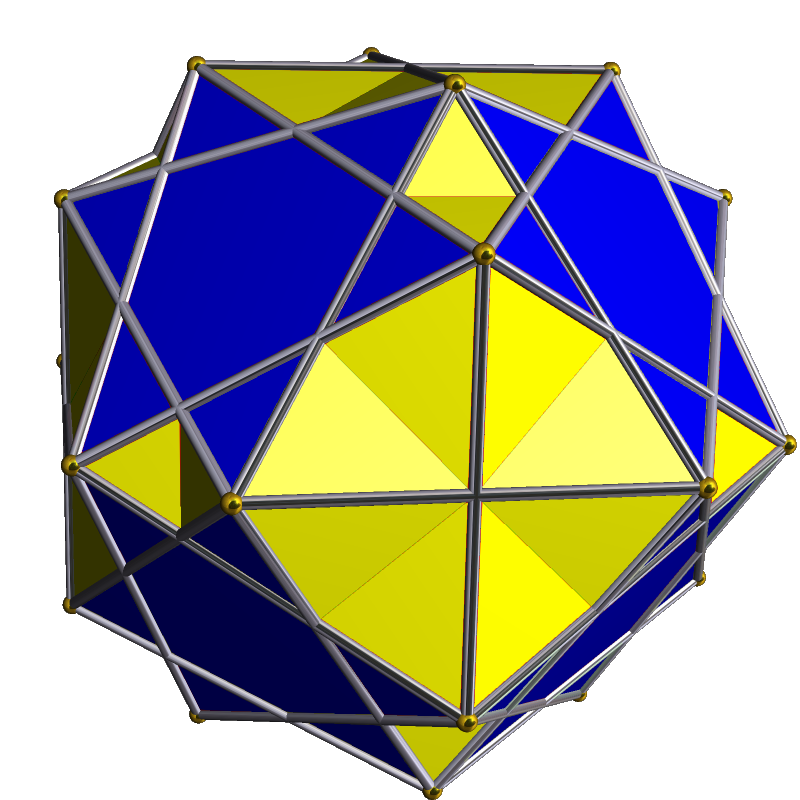
Holosnub octahedron, β{3,4}

This uniform polyhedron compound is a composition of 2 icosahedra. It has octahedral symmetry O_{h}. As a holosnub, it is represented by Schläfli symbol β{3,4} and Coxeter diagram.

The triangles in this compound decompose into two orbits under action of the symmetry group: 16 of the triangles lie in coplanar pairs in octahedral planes, while the other 24 lie in unique planes.

It shares the same vertex arrangement as a nonuniform truncated octahedron, having irregular hexagons alternating with long and short edges.

Nonuniform and uniform truncated octahedra. The first shares its vertex arrangement with this compound.

The icosahedron, as a uniform snub tetrahedron, is similar to these snub-pair compounds: compound of two snub cubes and compound of two snub dodecahedra.

Together with its convex hull, it represents the icosahedron-first projection of the nonuniform snub tetrahedral antiprism.

== Cartesian coordinates ==
Cartesian coordinates for the vertices of this compound are all the permutations of

(±1, 0, ±τ)

where τ = (1+√5)/2 is the golden ratio (sometimes written φ).

== Compound of two dodecahedra ==
The dual compound has two dodecahedra as pyritohedra in dual positions:

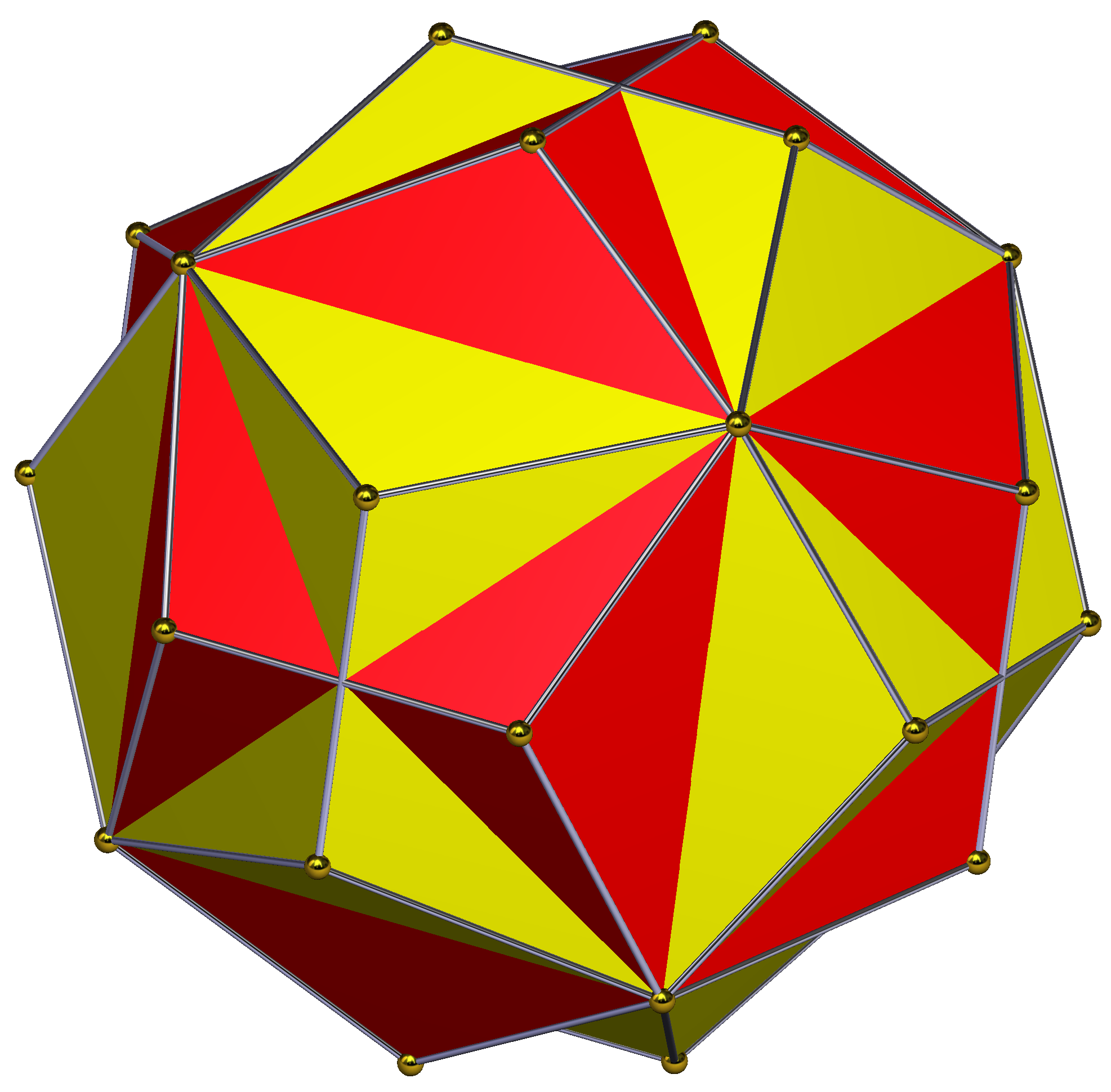

== See also ==
- Compound of two snub cubes
- Compound of two snub dodecahedra
