= Order-5 tesseractic honeycomb =

Order-5 tesseractic honeycomb
(No image)
Type	Hyperbolic regular honeycomb
Schläfli symbol	{4,3,3,5}
Coxeter diagram	
4-faces	{4,3,3}
Cells	{4,3}
Faces	{4}
Face figure	{5}
Edge figure	{3,5}
Vertex figure	{3,3,5}
Dual	Order-4 120-cell honeycomb
Coxeter group	B̅H̅_{4}, [5,3,3,4]
Properties	Regular

In the geometry of hyperbolic 4-space, the order-5 tesseractic honeycomb is one of five compact regular space-filling tessellations (or honeycombs). With Schläfli symbol {4,3,3,5}, it has five 8-cells (also known as tesseracts) around each face. Acronym: pitest

Its dual is the order-4 120-cell honeycomb, {5,3,3,4}.

== Related polytopes and honeycombs ==
It is related to the Euclidean 4-space (order-4) tesseractic honeycomb, {4,3,3,4}, and the 5-cube, {4,3,3,3} in Euclidean 5-space. The 5-cube can also be seen as an order-3 tesseractic honeycomb on the surface of a 4-sphere.

== See also ==
- List of regular polytopes
