= Icosahedral 120-cell =

Icosahedral 120-cell
Orthogonal projection
Type	Schläfli-Hess polytope
Cells	120 {3,5}
Faces	1200 {3}
Edges	720
Vertices	120
Vertex figure	{5,5/2}
Schläfli symbol	{3,5,5/2}
Symmetry group	H_{4}, [3,3,5]
Coxeter-Dynkin diagram	
Dual	Small stellated 120-cell
Properties	Regular

In geometry, the icosahedral 120-cell, polyicosahedron, faceted 600-cell or icosaplex is a regular star 4-polytope with Schläfli symbol {3,5,5/2}. It is one of 10 regular Schläfli-Hess polytopes.

It is constructed by 5 icosahedra around each edge in a pentagrammic figure. The vertex figure is a great dodecahedron.

== Related polytopes ==
It has the same edge arrangement as the 600-cell, grand 120-cell and great 120-cell, and shares its vertices with all other Schläfli–Hess 4-polytopes except the great grand stellated 120-cell (another stellation of the 120-cell).

Orthographic projections by Coxeter planes
H_{4}	-	F_{4}
[30]	[20]	[12]
H_{3}	A_{2} / B_{3} / D_{4}	A_{3} / B_{2}
[10]	[6]	[4]

As a faceted 600-cell, replacing the simplicial cells of the 600-cell with icosahedral pentagonal polytope cells, it could be seen as a four-dimensional analogue of the great dodecahedron, which replaces the triangular faces of the icosahedron with pentagonal faces. Indeed, the icosahedral 120-cell is dual to the small stellated 120-cell, which could be taken as a 4D analogue of the small stellated dodecahedron, dual of the great dodecahedron.

== See also ==
- List of regular polytopes
- Convex regular 4-polytope
- Kepler-Poinsot solids - regular star polyhedron
- Star polygon - regular star polygons
