= Great 120-cell =

Great 120-cell
Orthogonal projection
Type	Schläfli-Hess polytope
Cells	120 {5,5/2}
Faces	720 {5}
Edges	720
Vertices	120
Vertex figure	{5/2,5}
Schläfli symbol	{5,5/2,5}
Coxeter-Dynkin diagram	
Symmetry group	H_{4}, [3,3,5]
Dual	self-dual
Properties	Regular

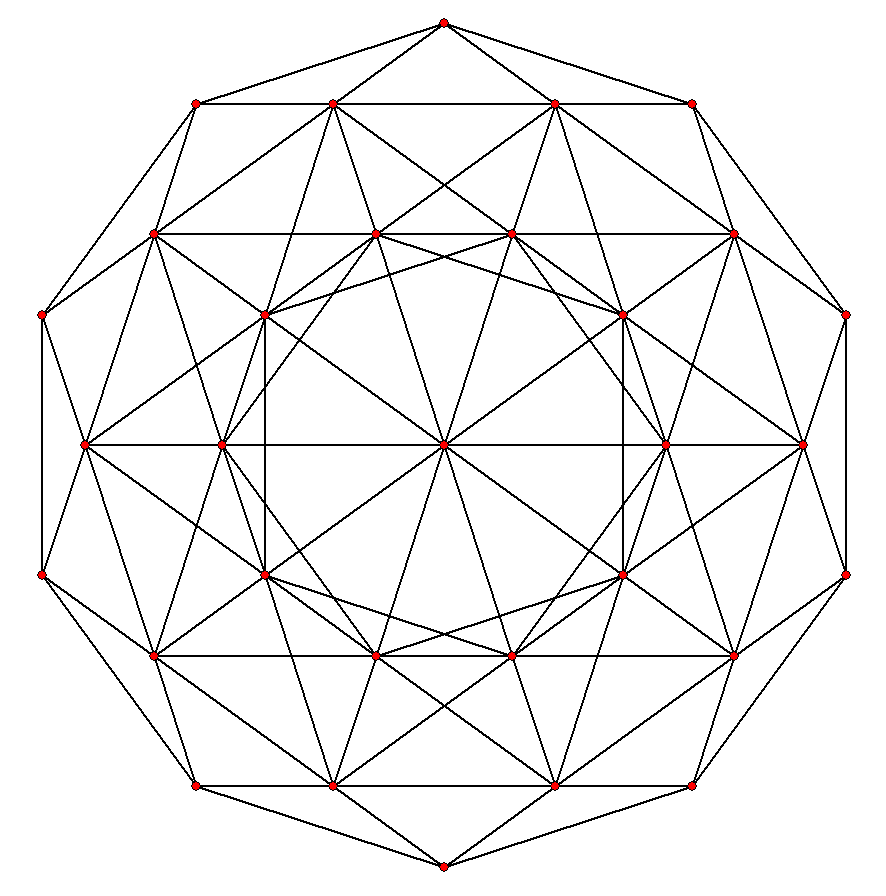
Orthogonal projection as a wireframe

In geometry, the great 120-cell or great polydodecahedron is a regular star 4-polytope with Schläfli symbol {5,5/2,5}. It is one of 10 regular Schläfli-Hess polytopes. It is one of the two such polytopes that is self-dual.

== Related polytopes ==
It has the same edge arrangement as the 600-cell, icosahedral 120-cell as well as the same face arrangement as the grand 120-cell.

Orthographic projections by Coxeter planes
H_{4}	-	F_{4}
[30]	[20]	[12]
H_{3}	A_{2} / B_{3} / D_{4}	A_{3} / B_{2}
[10]	[6]	[4]

Due to its self-duality, it does not have a good three-dimensional analogue, but (like all other star polyhedra and polychora) is analogous to the two-dimensional pentagram.

== See also ==
- List of regular polytopes
- Convex regular 4-polytope
- Kepler-Poinsot solids regular star polyhedron
- Star polygon regular star polygons
