= List of uniform polyhedra by spherical triangle =

Polyhedron
Class	Number and properties
Platonic solids	(5, convex, regular)
Archimedean solids	(13, convex, uniform)
Kepler–Poinsot polyhedra	(4, regular, non-convex)
Uniform polyhedra	(75, uniform)
Prismatoid: prisms, antiprisms etc.	(4 infinite uniform classes)
Polyhedra tilings	(11 regular, in the plane)
Quasi-regular polyhedra	(8)
Johnson solids	(92, convex, non-uniform)
Bipyramids	(infinite)
Pyramids	(infinite)
Stellations	Stellations
Polyhedral compounds	(5 regular)
Deltahedra	(Deltahedra, equilateral triangle faces)
Snub polyhedra	(12 uniform, not mirror image)
Zonohedron	(Zonohedra, faces have 180°symmetry)
Dual polyhedron
Self-dual polyhedron	(infinite)
Catalan solid	(13, Archimedean dual)

There are many relations among the uniform polyhedra. This List of uniform polyhedra by spherical triangle groups them by the Wythoff symbol.

== Key ==
Image
Name
Bowers pet name
V Number of vertices,E Number of edges,F Number of faces=Face configuration
?=Euler characteristic, group=Symmetry group
Wythoff symbol - Vertex figure
W - Wenninger number, U - Uniform number, K- Kalido number, C -Coxeter number
alternative name
second alternative name

The vertex figure can be discovered by considering the Wythoff symbol:

- p|q r - 2p edges, alternating q-gons and r-gons. Vertex figure (q.r)^{p}.
- p|q 2 - p edges, q-gons (here r=2 so the r-gons are degenerate lines).
- 2|q r - 4 edges, alternating q-gons and r-gons
- q r|p - 4 edges, 2p-gons, q-gons, 2p-gons r-gons, Vertex figure 2p.q.2p.r.
- q 2|p - 3 edges, 2p-gons, q-gons, 2p-gons, Vertex figure 2p.q.2p.
- p q r|- 3 edges, 2p-gons, 2q-gons, 2r-gons, vertex figure 2p.2q.2r

== Convex ==
Spherical triangle ${\pi\over p}\ {\pi\over q}\ {\pi\over r}$	p|q r	q|p r	r|p q	q r|p	p r|q	p q|r	p q r|	|p q r
${\pi\over 3}\ {\pi\over 3}\ {\pi\over 2}$	Tetrahedron; Tet; V 4,E 6,F 4=4{3} χ=2, group=T_{d}, A_{3}, [3,3], (*332); 3 | 2 3 | 2 2 2 - 3.3.3; W1, U01, K06, C15		Octahedron	Truncated tetrahedron Tut; V 12,E 18,F 8=4{3}+4{6} χ=2, group=T_{d}, A_{3}, [3,3], (*332), order 24; 2 3 | 3 - 3.6.6; W6, U02, K07, C16		Cuboctahedron	Truncated octahedron	Icosahedron
${\pi\over 4}\ {\pi\over 3}\ {\pi\over 2}$	Octahedron; Oct; V 6,E 12,F 8=8{3} χ=2, group=O_{h}, BC_{3}, [4,3], (*432); 4 | 2 3 - 3.3.3.3; W2, U05, K10, C17	Hexahedron; Cube; V 8,E 12,F 6=6{4} χ=2, group=O_{h}, B_{3}, [4,3], (*432); 3 | 2 4 - 4.4.4; W3, U06, K11, C18	Cuboctahedron; Co; V 12,E 24,F 14=8{3}+6{4} χ=2, group=O_{h}, B_{3}, [4,3], (*432), order 48; T_{d}, [3,3], (*332), order 24; 2 | 3 4; 3 3 | 2 - 3.4.3.4; W11, U07, K12, C19	Truncated cube Tic; V 24,E 36,F 14=8{3}+6{8} χ=2, group=O_{h}, B_{3}, [4,3], (*432), order 48; 2 3 | 4 - 3.8.8; W8, U09, K14, C21; Truncated hexahedron	Truncated octahedron Toe; V 24,E 36,F 14=6{4}+8{6} χ=2, group=O_{h}, B_{3}, [4,3], (*432), order 48; T_{h}, [3,3] and (*332), order 24; 2 4 | 3; 3 3 2 | - 4.6.6; W7, U08, K13, C20	Rhombicuboctahedron; Sirco; V 24,E 48,F 26=8{3}+(6+12){4} χ=2, group=O_{h}, B_{3}, [4,3], (*432), order 48; 3 4 | 2 - 3.4.4.4; W13, U10, K15, C22; Rhombicuboctahedron	Truncated cuboctahedron Girco; V 48,E 72,F 26=12{4}+8{6}+6{8} χ=2, group=O_{h}, B_{3}, [4,3], (*432), order 48; 2 3 4 | - 4.6.8; W15, U11, K16, C23; Rhombitruncated cuboctahedron Truncated cuboctahedron	Snub cube Snic; V 24,E 60,F 38=(8+24){3}+6{4} χ=2, group=O, 1/2B_{3}, [4,3]^{+}, (432), order 24 | 2 3 4 - 3.3.3.3.4; W17, U12, K17, C24
${\pi\over 5}\ {\pi\over 3}\ {\pi\over 2}$	Icosahedron; Ike; V 12,E 30,F 20=20{3} χ=2, group=I_{h}, H_{3}, [5,3], (*532); 5 | 2 3 - 3.3.3.3.3; W4, U22, K27, C25	Dodecahedron; Doe; V 20,E 30,F 12=12{5} χ=2, group=I_{h}, H_{3}, [5,3], (*532); 3 | 2 5 - 5.5.5; W5, U23, K28, C26	Icosidodecahedron; Id; V 30,E 60,F 32=20{3}+12{5} χ=2, group=I_{h}, H_{3}, [5,3], (*532), order 120; 2 | 3 5 - 3.5.3.5; W12, U24, K29, C28	Truncated dodecahedron Tid; V 60,E 90,F 32=20{3}+12{10} χ=2, group=I_{h}, H_{3}, [5,3], (*532), order 120; 2 3 | 5 - 3.10.10; W10, U26, K31, C29	Truncated icosahedron Ti; V 60,E 90,F 32=12{5}+20{6} χ=2, group=I_{h}, H_{3}, [5,3], (*532), order 120; 2 5 | 3 - 5.6.6; W9, U25, K30, C27	Rhombicosidodecahedron; Srid; V 60,E 120,F 62=20{3}+30{4}+12{5} χ=2, group=I_{h}, H_{3}, [5,3], (*532), order 120; 3 5 | 2 - 3.4.5.4; W14, U27, K32, C30; Rhombicosidodecahedron	Truncated icosidodecahedron Grid; V 120,E 180,F 62=30{4}+20{6}+12{10} χ=2, group=I_{h}, H_{3}, [5,3], (*532), order 120; 2 3 5 | - 4.6.10; W16, U28, K33, C31; Rhombitruncated icosidodecahedron Truncated icosidodecahedron	Snub dodecahedron Snid; V 60,E 150,F 92=(20+60){3}+12{5} χ=2, group=I, 1/2H_{3}, [5,3]^{+}, (532), order 60 | 2 3 5 - 3.3.3.3.5; W18, U29, K34, C32

== Non-convex ==
=== a b 2 ===
==== 3 3 2 ====
${a\pi\over 3}\ {b\pi\over 3}\ {c\pi\over 2}$ Group

Spherical triangle ${\pi\over p}\ {\pi\over q}\ {\pi\over r}$	p|q r	q|p r	r|p q	q r|p	p r|q	p q|r	p q r|	|p q r
${\pi\over 3}\ {\pi\over 2}\ {2\pi\over 3}$					Tetrahemihexahedron; Thah; V 6,E 12,F 7=4{3}+3{4} χ=1, group=T_{d}, [3,3], *332; 3/2 3 | 2 (double-covering) - 3.4.3/2.4; W67, U04, K09, C36			

==== 4 3 2 ====
${a\pi\over 4}\ {b\pi\over 3}\ {c\pi\over 2}$ Group

Spherical triangle ${\pi\over p}\ {\pi\over q}\ {\pi\over r}$	p|q r	q|p r	r|p q	q r|p	p r|q	p q|r	p q r|	|p q r
${\pi\over 4}\ {2\pi\over 3}\ {\pi\over 2}$	octahedron	cube		Stellated truncated hexahedron Quith; V 24,E 36,F 14=8{3}+6{8/3} χ=2, group=O_{h}, [4,3], *432; 2 3 | 4/3; 2 3/2 | 4/3 - 3.8/3.8/3; W92, U19, K24, C66; Quasitruncated hexahedron stellatruncated cube		Nonconvex great rhombicuboctahedron Querco; V 24,E 48,F 26=8{3}+(6+12){4} χ=2, group=O_{h}, [4,3], *432; 3/2 4 | 2; 3 4/3 | 2 - 4.4.4.3/2; W85, U17, K22, C59; Quasirhombicuboctahedron	Small rhombihexahedron Sroh; V 24,E 48,F 18=12{4}+6{8} χ=−6, group=O_{h}, [4,3], *432; 2 4 (3/2 4/2) | - 4.8.4/3.8/7; W86, U18, K23, C60	
${3\pi\over 4}\ {\pi\over 3}\ {\pi\over 2}$							Great truncated cuboctahedron Quitco; V 48,E 72,F 26=12{4}+8{6}+6{8/3} χ=2, group=O_{h}, [4,3], *432; 2 3 4/3 | - 4.6/5.8/3; W93, U20, K25, C67; Quasitruncated cuboctahedron	
${3\pi\over 4}\ {2\pi\over 3}\ {\pi\over 2}$							Great rhombihexahedron Groh; V 24,E 48,F 18=12{4}+6{8/3} χ=−6, group=O_{h}, [4,3], *432; 2 4/3 (3/2 4/2) | - 4.8/3.4/3.8/5; W103, U21, K26, C82	

==== 5 3 2 ====
${a\pi\over 5}\ {b\pi\over 3}\ {c\pi\over 2}$ Group

Spherical triangle ${\pi\over p}\ {\pi\over q}\ {\pi\over r}$	p|q r	q|p r	r|p q	q r|p	p r|q	p q|r
${2\pi\over 5}\ {\pi\over 3}\ {\pi\over 2}$	Great icosahedron Gike; V 12,E 30,F 20=20{3} χ=2, group=I_{h}, H_{3}, [5,3], (*532); 5/2 | 2 3 - (3^{5})/2; W41, U53, K58, C69	Great stellated dodecahedron Gissid; V 20,E 30,F 12=12 { 5/2 } χ=2, group=I_{h}, H_{3}, [5,3], (*532); 3 | 2 5/2 - (5/2)^{3} W22, U52, K57, C68	Great icosidodecahedron Gid; V 30,E 60,F 32=20{3}+12{5/2} χ=2, group=I_{h}, [5,3], *532; 2 | 3 5/2; 2 | 3 5/3; 2 | 3/2 5/2; 2 | 3/2 5/3 - 3.5/2.3.5/2; W94, U54, K59, C70	Great stellated truncated dodecahedron Quit Gissid; V 60,E 90,F 32=20{3}+12{10/3} χ=2, group=I_{h}, [5,3], *532; 2 3 | 5/3 - 3.10/3.10/3; W104, U66, K71, C83; Quasitruncated great stellated dodecahedron Great stellatruncated dodecahedron	Truncated great icosahedron Tiggy; V 60,E 90,F 32=12{5/2}+20{6} χ=2, group=I_{h}, [5,3], *532; 2 5/2 | 3; 2 5/3 | 3 - 6.6.5/2; W95, U55, K60, C71	Nonconvex great rhombicosidodecahedron Qrid; V 60,E 120,F 62=20{3}+30{4}+12{5/2} χ=2, group=I_{h}, [5,3], *532; 5/3 3 | 2; 5/2 3/2 | 2 - 3.4.5/3.4; W105, U67, K72, C84; Quasirhombicosidodecahedron
	p q r|	p q r|	p q r|	|p q r		
${3\pi\over 5}\ {\pi\over 3}\ {\pi\over 2}$	Rhombicosahedron; Ri; V 60,E 120,F 50=30{4}+20{6} χ=−10, group=I_{h}, [5,3], *532; 2 3 (5/4 5/2) | - 4.6.4/3.6/5; W96, U56, K61, C72	Great truncated icosidodecahedron Gaquatid; V 120,E 180,F 62=30{4}+20{6}+12{10/3} χ=2, group=I_{h}, [5,3], *532; 2 3 5/3 | - 4.6.10/3; W108, U68, K73, C87; Great quasitruncated icosidodecahedron	Great rhombidodecahedron Gird; V 60,E 120,F 42=30{4}+12{10/3} χ=−18, group=I_{h}, [5,3], *532; 2 5/3 (3/2 5/4) | - 4.10/3.4/3.10/7; W109, U73, K78, C89			

==== 5 5 2 ====
${a\pi\over 5}\ {b\pi\over 5}\ {c\pi\over 2}$ Group

Spherical triangle ${\pi\over p}\ {\pi\over q}\ {\pi\over r}$	p|q r	q|p r	r|p q	q r|p	p r|q	p q|r
${\pi\over 5}\ {2\pi\over 5}\ {\pi\over 2}$	Small stellated dodecahedron Sissid; V 12,E 30,F 12=12 5 χ=-6, group=I_{h}, H_{3}, [5,3], (*532); 5 | 2 5/2 - (5/2)^{5} W20, U34, K39, C43	Great dodecahedron Gad; V 12,E 30,F 12=12{5} χ=-6, group=I_{h}, H_{3}, [5,3], (*532); 5/2 | 2 5 - (5^{5})/2; W21, U35, K40, C44	Dodecadodecahedron; Did; V 30,E 60,F 24=12{5}+12{5/2} χ=−6, group=I_{h}, [5,3], *532; 2 | 5 5/2; 2 | 5 5/3; 2 | 5/2 5/4; 2 | 5/3 5/4 - 5.5/2.5.5/2; W73, U36, K41, C45	Small stellated truncated dodecahedron Quit Sissid; V 60,E 90,F 24=12{5}+12{10/3} χ=−6, group=I_{h}, [5,3], *532; 2 5 | 5/3; 2 5/4 | 5/3 - 5.10/3.10/3; W97, U58, K63, C74; Quasitruncated small stellated dodecahedron Small stellatruncated dodecahedron	Truncated great dodecahedron Tigid; V 60,E 90,F 24=12{5/2}+12{10} χ=−6, group=I_{h}, [5,3], *532; 2 5/2 | 5; 2 5/3 | 5 - 10.10.5/2; W75, U37, K42, C47	Rhombidodecadodecahedron; Raded; V 60,E 120,F 54=30{4}+12{5}+12{5/2} χ=−6, group=I_{h}, [5,3], *532; 5/2 5 | 2 - 4.5/2.4.5; W76, U38, K43, C48
	p q r|	p q r|	|p q r			
${\pi\over 5}\ {3\pi\over 5}\ {\pi\over 2}$	Small rhombidodecahedron Sird; V 60,E 120,F 42=30{4}+12{10} χ=−18, group=I_{h}, [5,3], *532; 2 5 (3/2 5/2) | - 4.10.4/3.10/9; W74, U39, K44, C46	Truncated dodecadodecahedron Quitdid; V 120,E 180,F 54=30{4}+12{10}+12{10/3} χ=−6, group=I_{h}, [5,3], *532; 2 5 5/3 | - 4.10/9.10/3; W98, U59, K64, C75; Quasitruncated dodecadodecahedron				

=== a b 3 ===
==== 3 3 3 ====
${a\pi\over 3}\ {b\pi\over 3}\ {c\pi\over 3}$ Group

Spherical triangle ${\pi\over p}\ {\pi\over q}\ {\pi\over r}$	p|q r	q|p r	r|p q	q r|p	p r|q	p q|r	p q r|	|p q r
${\pi\over 3}\ {\pi\over 3}\ {2\pi\over 3}$				Octahemioctahedron; Oho; V 12,E 24,F 12=8{3}+4{6} χ=0, group=O_{h}, [4,3], *432; 3/2 3 | 3 - 3.6.3/2.6; W68, U03, K08, C37				

==== 4 3 3 ====
${a\pi\over 4}\ {b\pi\over 3}\ {c\pi\over 3}$ Group

Spherical triangle ${\pi\over p}\ {\pi\over q}\ {\pi\over r}$	p|q r	q|p r	r|p q	q r|p	p r|q	p q|r	p q r|	|p q r

==== 5 3 3 ====
${a\pi\over 5}\ {b\pi\over 3}\ {c\pi\over 3}$ Group

Spherical triangle ${\pi\over p}\ {\pi\over q}\ {\pi\over r}$	p|q r	q|p r	r|p q	q r|p	p r|q	p q|r
${3\pi\over 5}\ {\pi\over 3}\ {\pi\over 3}$	Great ditrigonal icosidodecahedron Gidtid; V 20,E 60,F 32=20{3}+12{5} χ=−8, group=I_{h}, [5,3], *532; 3/2 | 3 5; 3 | 3/2 5; 3 | 3 5/4; 3/2 | 3/2 5/4 - ((3.5)^{3})/2; W87, U47, K52, C61	Small ditrigonal icosidodecahedron Sidtid; V 20,E 60,F 32=20{3}+12{5/2} χ=−8, group=I_{h}, [5,3], *532; 3 | 5/2 3 - (3.5/2)^{3} W70, U30, K35, C39		Great icosihemidodecahedron Geihid; V 30,E 60,F 26=20{3}+6{10/3} χ=−4, group=I_{h}, [5,3], *532; 3/2 3 | 5/3 - 3.10/3.3/2.10/3; W106, U71, K76, C85	Small icosihemidodecahedron Seihid; V 30,E 60,F 26=20{3}+6{10} χ=−4, group=I_{h}, [5,3], *532; 3/2 3 | 5 (double covering) - 3.10.3/2.10; W89, U49, K54, C63	Great icosicosidodecahedron Giid; V 60,E 120,F 52=20{3}+12{5}+20{6} χ=−8, group=I_{h}, [5,3], *532; 3/2 5 | 3; 3 5/4 | 3 - 5.6.3/2.6; W88, U48, K53, C62
	p q r|	p q r|	|p q r			
${\pi\over 5}\ {2\pi\over 3}\ {\pi\over 3}$	Small icosicosidodecahedron Siid; V 60,E 120,F 52=20{3}+12{5/2}+20{6} χ=−8, group=I_{h}, [5,3], *532; 5/2 3 | 3 - 6.5/2.6.3; W71, U31, K36, C40	Small dodecicosahedron Siddy; V 60,E 120,F 32=20{6}+12{10} χ=−28, group=I_{h}, [5,3], *532; 3 5 (3/2 5/4) | - 6.10.6/5.10/9; W90, U50, K55, C64				

==== 4 4 3 ====
${a\pi\over 4}\ {b\pi\over 4}\ {c\pi\over 3}$ Group

Spherical triangle ${\pi\over p}\ {\pi\over q}\ {\pi\over r}$	p|q r	q|p r	r|p q	q r|p	p r|q	p q|r	p q r|	|p q r
${\pi\over 4}\ {\pi\over 3}\ {3\pi\over 4}$					Cubohemioctahedron; Cho; V 12,E 24,F 10=6{4}+4{6} χ=−2, group=O_{h}, [4,3], *432; 4/3 4 | 3 (double-covering) - 4.6.4/3.6; W78, U15, K20, C51	Great cubicuboctahedron Gocco; V 24,E 48,F 20=8{3}+6{4}+6{8/3} χ=−4, group=O_{h}, [4,3], *432; 3 4 | 4/3; 4 3/2 | 4 - 3.8/3.4.8/3; W77, U14, K19, C50	Cubitruncated cuboctahedron Cotco; V 48,E 72,F 20=8{6}+6{8}+6{8/3} χ=−4, group=O_{h}, [4,3], *432; 3 4 4/3 | - 6.8.8/3; W79, U16, K21, C52; Cuboctatruncated cuboctahedron	
${\pi\over 4}\ {\pi\over 4}\ {2\pi\over 3}$				Small cubicuboctahedron Socco; V 24,E 48,F 20=8{3}+6{4}+6{8} χ=−4, group=O_{h}, [4,3], *432; 3/2 4 | 4; 3 4/3 | 4 - 4.8.3/2.8; W69, U13, K18, C38				

==== 5 5 3 ====
${a\pi\over 5}\ {b\pi\over 5}\ {c\pi\over 3}$ Group

Spherical triangle ${\pi\over p}\ {\pi\over q}\ {\pi\over r}$	p|q r	q|p r	r|p q	q r|p	p r|q	p q|r	p q r|	|p q r
${\pi\over 3}\ {2\pi\over 5}\ {3\pi\over 5}$				Small dodecahemicosahedron Sidhei; V 30,E 60,F 22=12{5/2}+10{6} χ=−8, group=I_{h}, [5,3], *532; 5/3 5/2 | 3 (double covering) - 6.5/2.6.5/3; W100, U62, K67, C78	Great dodecicosahedron Giddy; V 60,E 120,F 32=20{6}+12{10/3} χ=−28, group=I_{h}, [5,3], *532; 3 5/3 (3/2 5/2) | - 6.10/3.6/5.10/7; W101, U63, K68, C79	Small dodecicosidodecahedron Saddid; V 60,E 120,F 44=20{3}+12{5}+12{10} χ=−16, group=I_{h}, [5,3], *532; 3/2 5 | 5; 3 5/4 | 5 - 5.10.3/2.10; W72, U33, K38, C42		
${\pi\over 3}\ {\pi\over 5}\ {4\pi\over 5}$				Great dodecahemicosahedron Gidhei; V 30,E 60,F 22=12{5}+10{6} χ=−8, group=I_{h}, [5,3], *532; 5/4 5 | 3 (double covering) - 5.6.5/4.6; W102, U65, K70, C81	Small ditrigonal dodecicosidodecahedron Sidditdid; V 60,E 120,F 44=20{3}+12{5/2}+12{10} χ=−16, group=I_{h}, [5,3], *532; 5/3 3 | 5; 5/2 3/2 | 5 - 3.10.5/3.10; W82, U43, K48, C55	Great ditrigonal dodecicosidodecahedron Gidditdid; V 60,E 120,F 44=20{3}+12{5}+12{10/3} χ=−16, group=I_{h}, [5,3], *532; 3 5 | 5/3; 5/4 3/2 | 5/3 - 3.10/3.5.10/3; W81, U42, K47, C54		
${\pi\over 5}\ {\pi\over 5}\ {2\pi\over 3}$				Small dodecicosidodecahedron Saddid; V 60,E 120,F 44=20{3}+12{5}+12{10} χ=−16, group=I_{h}, [5,3], *532; 3/2 5 | 5; 3 5/4 | 5 - 5.10.3/2.10; W72, U33, K38, C42	Great dodecicosidodecahedron Gaddid; V 60,E 120,F 44=20{3}+12{5/2}+12{10/3} χ=−16, group=I_{h}, [5,3], *532; 5/2 3 | 5/3; 5/3 3/2 | 5/3 - 3.10/3.5/2.10/7; W99, U61, K66, C77			
${\pi\over 5}\ {\pi\over 3}\ {3\pi\over 5}$		Ditrigonal dodecadodecahedron Ditdid; V 20,E 60,F 24=12{5}+12{5/2} χ=−16, group=I_{h}, [5,3], *532; 3 | 5/3 5; 3/2 | 5 5/2; 3/2 | 5/3 5/4; 3 | 5/2 5/4 - (5.5/3)^{3} W80, U41, K46, C53		Icosidodecadodecahedron; Ided; V 60,E 120,F 44=12{5}+12{5/2}+20{6} χ=−16, group=I_{h}, [5,3], *532; 5/3 5 | 3; 5/2 5/4 | 3 - 5.6.5/3.6; W83, U44, K49, C56	Small ditrigonal dodecicosidodecahedron Sidditdid; V 60,E 120,F 44=20{3}+12{5/2}+12{10} χ=−16, group=I_{h}, [5,3], *532; 5/3 3 | 5; 5/2 3/2 | 5 - 3.10.5/3.10; W82, U43, K48, C55	Icositruncated dodecadodecahedron Idtid; V 120,E 180,F 44=20{6}+12{10}+12{10/3} χ=−16, group=I_{h}, [5,3], *532; 3 5 5/3 | - 6.10.10/3; W84, U45, K50, C57; Icosidodecatruncated icosidodecahedron		

=== a b 5 ===
==== 5 5 5 ====
${a\pi\over 5}\ {b\pi\over 5}\ {c\pi\over 5}$ Group

Spherical triangle ${\pi\over p}\ {\pi\over q}\ {\pi\over r}$	p|q r	q|p r	r|p q	q r|p	p r|q	p q|r	p q r|	|p q r
${2\pi\over 5}\ {3\pi\over 5}\ {3\pi\over 5}$					Great dodecahemidodecahedron Gidhid; V 30,E 60,F 18=12{5/2}+6{10/3} χ=−12, group=I_{h}, [5,3], *532; 5/3 5/2 | 5/3 (double covering) - 5/2.10/3.5/3.10/3; W107, U70, K75, C86			
