= List of uniform polyhedra by Wythoff symbol =

Polyhedron
Class	Number and properties
Platonic solids	(5, convex, regular)
Archimedean solids	(13, convex, uniform)
Kepler–Poinsot polyhedra	(4, regular, non-convex)
Uniform polyhedra	(75, uniform)
Prismatoid: prisms, antiprisms etc.	(4 infinite uniform classes)
Polyhedra tilings	(11 regular, in the plane)
Quasi-regular polyhedra	(8)
Johnson solids	(92, convex, non-uniform)
Bipyramids	(infinite)
Pyramids	(infinite)
Stellations	Stellations
Polyhedral compounds	(5 regular)
Deltahedra	(Deltahedra, equilateral triangle faces)
Snub polyhedra	(12 uniform, not mirror image)
Zonohedron	(Zonohedra, faces have 180°symmetry)
Dual polyhedron
Self-dual polyhedron	(infinite)
Catalan solid	(13, Archimedean dual)

There are many relations among the uniform polyhedra.

Here they are grouped by the Wythoff symbol.

== Key ==
Image
Name
Bowers pet name
V Number of vertices,E Number of edges,F Number of faces=Face configuration
?=Euler characteristic, group=Symmetry group
Wythoff symbol – Vertex figure
W – Wenninger number, U – Uniform number, K- Kaleido number, C -Coxeter number
alternative name
second alternative name

== Regular ==
All the faces are identical, each edge is identical and each vertex is identical. They all have a Wythoff symbol of the form p|q 2.

=== Convex ===
The Platonic solids.

Tetrahedron; Tet; V 4,E 6,F 4=4{3} χ=2, group=T_{d}, A_{3}, [3,3], (*332); 3 | 2 3 | 2 2 2 - 3.3.3; W1, U01, K06, C15	Octahedron; Oct; V 6,E 12,F 8=8{3} χ=2, group=O_{h}, BC_{3}, [4,3], (*432); 4 | 2 3 - 3.3.3.3; W2, U05, K10, C17	Hexahedron; Cube; V 8,E 12,F 6=6{4} χ=2, group=O_{h}, B_{3}, [4,3], (*432); 3 | 2 4 - 4.4.4; W3, U06, K11, C18	Icosahedron; Ike; V 12,E 30,F 20=20{3} χ=2, group=I_{h}, H_{3}, [5,3], (*532); 5 | 2 3 - 3.3.3.3.3; W4, U22, K27, C25	Dodecahedron; Doe; V 20,E 30,F 12=12{5} χ=2, group=I_{h}, H_{3}, [5,3], (*532); 3 | 2 5 - 5.5.5; W5, U23, K28, C26

=== Non-convex ===
The Kepler-Poinsot solids.

Great icosahedron Gike; V 12,E 30,F 20=20{3} χ=2, group=I_{h}, H_{3}, [5,3], (*532); 5/2 | 2 3 - (3^{5})/2; W41, U53, K58, C69	Great dodecahedron Gad; V 12,E 30,F 12=12{5} χ=-6, group=I_{h}, H_{3}, [5,3], (*532); 5/2 | 2 5 - (5^{5})/2; W21, U35, K40, C44	Small stellated dodecahedron Sissid; V 12,E 30,F 12=12 5 χ=-6, group=I_{h}, H_{3}, [5,3], (*532); 5 | 2 5/2 - (5/2)^{5} W20, U34, K39, C43	Great stellated dodecahedron Gissid; V 20,E 30,F 12=12 { 5/2 } χ=2, group=I_{h}, H_{3}, [5,3], (*532); 3 | 2 5/2 - (5/2)^{3} W22, U52, K57, C68

== Quasi-regular ==
Each edge is identical and each vertex is identical. There are two types of faces which appear in an alternating fashion around each vertex. The first row are semi-regular with 4 faces around each vertex. They have Wythoff symbol 2|p q. The second row are ditrigonal with 6 faces around each vertex. They have Wythoff symbol 3|p q or ^{3}/_{2}|p q.

Cuboctahedron; Co; V 12,E 24,F 14=8{3}+6{4} χ=2, group=O_{h}, B_{3}, [4,3], (*432), order 48; T_{d}, [3,3], (*332), order 24; 2 | 3 4; 3 3 | 2 - 3.4.3.4; W11, U07, K12, C19	Icosidodecahedron; Id; V 30,E 60,F 32=20{3}+12{5} χ=2, group=I_{h}, H_{3}, [5,3], (*532), order 120; 2 | 3 5 - 3.5.3.5; W12, U24, K29, C28	Great icosidodecahedron Gid; V 30,E 60,F 32=20{3}+12{5/2} χ=2, group=I_{h}, [5,3], *532; 2 | 3 5/2; 2 | 3 5/3; 2 | 3/2 5/2; 2 | 3/2 5/3 - 3.5/2.3.5/2; W94, U54, K59, C70	Dodecadodecahedron; Did; V 30,E 60,F 24=12{5}+12{5/2} χ=−6, group=I_{h}, [5,3], *532; 2 | 5 5/2; 2 | 5 5/3; 2 | 5/2 5/4; 2 | 5/3 5/4 - 5.5/2.5.5/2; W73, U36, K41, C45
Small ditrigonal icosidodecahedron Sidtid; V 20,E 60,F 32=20{3}+12{5/2} χ=−8, group=I_{h}, [5,3], *532; 3 | 5/2 3 - (3.5/2)^{3} W70, U30, K35, C39	Ditrigonal dodecadodecahedron Ditdid; V 20,E 60,F 24=12{5}+12{5/2} χ=−16, group=I_{h}, [5,3], *532; 3 | 5/3 5; 3/2 | 5 5/2; 3/2 | 5/3 5/4; 3 | 5/2 5/4 - (5.5/3)^{3} W80, U41, K46, C53	Great ditrigonal icosidodecahedron Gidtid; V 20,E 60,F 32=20{3}+12{5} χ=−8, group=I_{h}, [5,3], *532; 3/2 | 3 5; 3 | 3/2 5; 3 | 3 5/4; 3/2 | 3/2 5/4 - ((3.5)^{3})/2; W87, U47, K52, C61	

== Wythoff p q|r ==
=== Truncated regular forms ===
Each vertex has three faces surrounding it, two of which are identical. These all have Wythoff symbols 2 p|q, some are constructed by truncating the regular solids.

Truncated tetrahedron Tut; V 12,E 18,F 8=4{3}+4{6} χ=2, group=T_{d}, A_{3}, [3,3], (*332), order 24; 2 3 | 3 - 3.6.6; W6, U02, K07, C16	Truncated octahedron Toe; V 24,E 36,F 14=6{4}+8{6} χ=2, group=O_{h}, B_{3}, [4,3], (*432), order 48; T_{h}, [3,3] and (*332), order 24; 2 4 | 3; 3 3 2 | - 4.6.6; W7, U08, K13, C20	Truncated cube Tic; V 24,E 36,F 14=8{3}+6{8} χ=2, group=O_{h}, B_{3}, [4,3], (*432), order 48; 2 3 | 4 - 3.8.8; W8, U09, K14, C21; Truncated hexahedron	Truncated icosahedron Ti; V 60,E 90,F 32=12{5}+20{6} χ=2, group=I_{h}, H_{3}, [5,3], (*532), order 120; 2 5 | 3 - 5.6.6; W9, U25, K30, C27	Truncated dodecahedron Tid; V 60,E 90,F 32=20{3}+12{10} χ=2, group=I_{h}, H_{3}, [5,3], (*532), order 120; 2 3 | 5 - 3.10.10; W10, U26, K31, C29
Truncated great dodecahedron Tigid; V 60,E 90,F 24=12{5/2}+12{10} χ=−6, group=I_{h}, [5,3], *532; 2 5/2 | 5; 2 5/3 | 5 - 10.10.5/2; W75, U37, K42, C47	Truncated great icosahedron Tiggy; V 60,E 90,F 32=12{5/2}+20{6} χ=2, group=I_{h}, [5,3], *532; 2 5/2 | 3; 2 5/3 | 3 - 6.6.5/2; W95, U55, K60, C71	Stellated truncated hexahedron Quith; V 24,E 36,F 14=8{3}+6{8/3} χ=2, group=O_{h}, [4,3], *432; 2 3 | 4/3; 2 3/2 | 4/3 - 3.8/3.8/3; W92, U19, K24, C66; Quasitruncated hexahedron stellatruncated cube	Small stellated truncated dodecahedron Quit Sissid; V 60,E 90,F 24=12{5}+12{10/3} χ=−6, group=I_{h}, [5,3], *532; 2 5 | 5/3; 2 5/4 | 5/3 - 5.10/3.10/3; W97, U58, K63, C74; Quasitruncated small stellated dodecahedron Small stellatruncated dodecahedron	Great stellated truncated dodecahedron Quit Gissid; V 60,E 90,F 32=20{3}+12{10/3} χ=2, group=I_{h}, [5,3], *532; 2 3 | 5/3 - 3.10/3.10/3; W104, U66, K71, C83; Quasitruncated great stellated dodecahedron Great stellatruncated dodecahedron

=== Hemipolyhedra ===
The hemipolyhedra all have faces which pass through the origin. Their Wythoff symbols are of the form p p/m|q or p/m p/n|q. With the exception of the tetrahemihexahedron they occur in pairs, and are closely related to the semi-regular polyhedra, like the cuboctohedron.

Tetrahemihexahedron; Thah; V 6,E 12,F 7=4{3}+3{4} χ=1, group=T_{d}, [3,3], *332; 3/2 3 | 2 (double-covering) - 3.4.3/2.4; W67, U04, K09, C36	Octahemioctahedron; Oho; V 12,E 24,F 12=8{3}+4{6} χ=0, group=O_{h}, [4,3], *432; 3/2 3 | 3 - 3.6.3/2.6; W68, U03, K08, C37	Cubohemioctahedron; Cho; V 12,E 24,F 10=6{4}+4{6} χ=−2, group=O_{h}, [4,3], *432; 4/3 4 | 3 (double-covering) - 4.6.4/3.6; W78, U15, K20, C51	Small icosihemidodecahedron Seihid; V 30,E 60,F 26=20{3}+6{10} χ=−4, group=I_{h}, [5,3], *532; 3/2 3 | 5 (double covering) - 3.10.3/2.10; W89, U49, K54, C63	Small dodecahemidodecahedron Sidhid; V 30,E 60,F 18=12{5}+6{10} χ=−12, group=I_{h}, [5,3], *532; 5/4 5 | 5 (double covering) - 5.10.5/4.10; W91, U51, K56, C65
Great icosihemidodecahedron Geihid; V 30,E 60,F 26=20{3}+6{10/3} χ=−4, group=I_{h}, [5,3], *532; 3/2 3 | 5/3 - 3.10/3.3/2.10/3; W106, U71, K76, C85	Great dodecahemidodecahedron Gidhid; V 30,E 60,F 18=12{5/2}+6{10/3} χ=−12, group=I_{h}, [5,3], *532; 5/3 5/2 | 5/3 (double covering) - 5/2.10/3.5/3.10/3; W107, U70, K75, C86	Great dodecahemicosahedron Gidhei; V 30,E 60,F 22=12{5}+10{6} χ=−8, group=I_{h}, [5,3], *532; 5/4 5 | 3 (double covering) - 5.6.5/4.6; W102, U65, K70, C81	Small dodecahemicosahedron Sidhei; V 30,E 60,F 22=12{5/2}+10{6} χ=−8, group=I_{h}, [5,3], *532; 5/3 5/2 | 3 (double covering) - 6.5/2.6.5/3; W100, U62, K67, C78	

=== Rhombic quasi-regular ===
Four faces around the vertex in the pattern p.q.r.q. The name rhombic stems from inserting a square in the cuboctahedron and icosidodecahedron. The Wythoff symbol is of the form p q|r.

Rhombicuboctahedron; Sirco; V 24,E 48,F 26=8{3}+(6+12){4} χ=2, group=O_{h}, B_{3}, [4,3], (*432), order 48; 3 4 | 2 - 3.4.4.4; W13, U10, K15, C22; Rhombicuboctahedron	Small cubicuboctahedron Socco; V 24,E 48,F 20=8{3}+6{4}+6{8} χ=−4, group=O_{h}, [4,3], *432; 3/2 4 | 4; 3 4/3 | 4 - 4.8.3/2.8; W69, U13, K18, C38	Great cubicuboctahedron Gocco; V 24,E 48,F 20=8{3}+6{4}+6{8/3} χ=−4, group=O_{h}, [4,3], *432; 3 4 | 4/3; 4 3/2 | 4 - 3.8/3.4.8/3; W77, U14, K19, C50	Nonconvex great rhombicuboctahedron Querco; V 24,E 48,F 26=8{3}+(6+12){4} χ=2, group=O_{h}, [4,3], *432; 3/2 4 | 2; 3 4/3 | 2 - 4.4.4.3/2; W85, U17, K22, C59; Quasirhombicuboctahedron
Rhombicosidodecahedron; Srid; V 60,E 120,F 62=20{3}+30{4}+12{5} χ=2, group=I_{h}, H_{3}, [5,3], (*532), order 120; 3 5 | 2 - 3.4.5.4; W14, U27, K32, C30; Rhombicosidodecahedron	Small dodecicosidodecahedron Saddid; V 60,E 120,F 44=20{3}+12{5}+12{10} χ=−16, group=I_{h}, [5,3], *532; 3/2 5 | 5; 3 5/4 | 5 - 5.10.3/2.10; W72, U33, K38, C42	Great dodecicosidodecahedron Gaddid; V 60,E 120,F 44=20{3}+12{5/2}+12{10/3} χ=−16, group=I_{h}, [5,3], *532; 5/2 3 | 5/3; 5/3 3/2 | 5/3 - 3.10/3.5/2.10/7; W99, U61, K66, C77	Nonconvex great rhombicosidodecahedron Qrid; V 60,E 120,F 62=20{3}+30{4}+12{5/2} χ=2, group=I_{h}, [5,3], *532; 5/3 3 | 2; 5/2 3/2 | 2 - 3.4.5/3.4; W105, U67, K72, C84; Quasirhombicosidodecahedron
Small icosicosidodecahedron Siid; V 60,E 120,F 52=20{3}+12{5/2}+20{6} χ=−8, group=I_{h}, [5,3], *532; 5/2 3 | 3 - 6.5/2.6.3; W71, U31, K36, C40	Small ditrigonal dodecicosidodecahedron Sidditdid; V 60,E 120,F 44=20{3}+12{5/2}+12{10} χ=−16, group=I_{h}, [5,3], *532; 5/3 3 | 5; 5/2 3/2 | 5 - 3.10.5/3.10; W82, U43, K48, C55	Rhombidodecadodecahedron; Raded; V 60,E 120,F 54=30{4}+12{5}+12{5/2} χ=−6, group=I_{h}, [5,3], *532; 5/2 5 | 2 - 4.5/2.4.5; W76, U38, K43, C48	Icosidodecadodecahedron; Ided; V 60,E 120,F 44=12{5}+12{5/2}+20{6} χ=−16, group=I_{h}, [5,3], *532; 5/3 5 | 3; 5/2 5/4 | 3 - 5.6.5/3.6; W83, U44, K49, C56
Great ditrigonal dodecicosidodecahedron Gidditdid; V 60,E 120,F 44=20{3}+12{5}+12{10/3} χ=−16, group=I_{h}, [5,3], *532; 3 5 | 5/3; 5/4 3/2 | 5/3 - 3.10/3.5.10/3; W81, U42, K47, C54	Great icosicosidodecahedron Giid; V 60,E 120,F 52=20{3}+12{5}+20{6} χ=−8, group=I_{h}, [5,3], *532; 3/2 5 | 3; 3 5/4 | 3 - 5.6.3/2.6; W88, U48, K53, C62		

== Even-sided forms ==
=== Wythoff p q r| ===
These have three different faces around each vertex, and the vertices do not lie on any plane of symmetry. They have Wythoff symbol p q r|, and vertex figures 2p.2q.2r.

Truncated cuboctahedron Girco; V 48,E 72,F 26=12{4}+8{6}+6{8} χ=2, group=O_{h}, B_{3}, [4,3], (*432), order 48; 2 3 4 | - 4.6.8; W15, U11, K16, C23; Rhombitruncated cuboctahedron Truncated cuboctahedron	Great truncated cuboctahedron Quitco; V 48,E 72,F 26=12{4}+8{6}+6{8/3} χ=2, group=O_{h}, [4,3], *432; 2 3 4/3 | - 4.6/5.8/3; W93, U20, K25, C67; Quasitruncated cuboctahedron	Cubitruncated cuboctahedron Cotco; V 48,E 72,F 20=8{6}+6{8}+6{8/3} χ=−4, group=O_{h}, [4,3], *432; 3 4 4/3 | - 6.8.8/3; W79, U16, K21, C52; Cuboctatruncated cuboctahedron	
Truncated icosidodecahedron Grid; V 120,E 180,F 62=30{4}+20{6}+12{10} χ=2, group=I_{h}, H_{3}, [5,3], (*532), order 120; 2 3 5 | - 4.6.10; W16, U28, K33, C31; Rhombitruncated icosidodecahedron Truncated icosidodecahedron	Great truncated icosidodecahedron Gaquatid; V 120,E 180,F 62=30{4}+20{6}+12{10/3} χ=2, group=I_{h}, [5,3], *532; 2 3 5/3 | - 4.6.10/3; W108, U68, K73, C87; Great quasitruncated icosidodecahedron	Icositruncated dodecadodecahedron Idtid; V 120,E 180,F 44=20{6}+12{10}+12{10/3} χ=−16, group=I_{h}, [5,3], *532; 3 5 5/3 | - 6.10.10/3; W84, U45, K50, C57; Icosidodecatruncated icosidodecahedron	Truncated dodecadodecahedron Quitdid; V 120,E 180,F 54=30{4}+12{10}+12{10/3} χ=−6, group=I_{h}, [5,3], *532; 2 5 5/3 | - 4.10/9.10/3; W98, U59, K64, C75; Quasitruncated dodecadodecahedron

=== Wythoff p q (r s)| ===
Vertex figure p.q.-p.-q. Wythoff p q (r s)|, mixing pqr| and pqs|.

Small rhombihexahedron Sroh; V 24,E 48,F 18=12{4}+6{8} χ=−6, group=O_{h}, [4,3], *432; 2 4 (3/2 4/2) | - 4.8.4/3.8/7; W86, U18, K23, C60	Great rhombihexahedron Groh; V 24,E 48,F 18=12{4}+6{8/3} χ=−6, group=O_{h}, [4,3], *432; 2 4/3 (3/2 4/2) | - 4.8/3.4/3.8/5; W103, U21, K26, C82	Rhombicosahedron; Ri; V 60,E 120,F 50=30{4}+20{6} χ=−10, group=I_{h}, [5,3], *532; 2 3 (5/4 5/2) | - 4.6.4/3.6/5; W96, U56, K61, C72	Great rhombidodecahedron Gird; V 60,E 120,F 42=30{4}+12{10/3} χ=−18, group=I_{h}, [5,3], *532; 2 5/3 (3/2 5/4) | - 4.10/3.4/3.10/7; W109, U73, K78, C89
Great dodecicosahedron Giddy; V 60,E 120,F 32=20{6}+12{10/3} χ=−28, group=I_{h}, [5,3], *532; 3 5/3 (3/2 5/2) | - 6.10/3.6/5.10/7; W101, U63, K68, C79	Small rhombidodecahedron Sird; V 60,E 120,F 42=30{4}+12{10} χ=−18, group=I_{h}, [5,3], *532; 2 5 (3/2 5/2) | - 4.10.4/3.10/9; W74, U39, K44, C46	Small dodecicosahedron Siddy; V 60,E 120,F 32=20{6}+12{10} χ=−28, group=I_{h}, [5,3], *532; 3 5 (3/2 5/4) | - 6.10.6/5.10/9; W90, U50, K55, C64	

== Snub polyhedra ==
These have Wythoff symbol |p q r, and one non-Wythoffian construction is given |p q r s.

=== Wythoff |p q r ===
Symmetry group			
O	Snub cube Snic; V 24,E 60,F 38=(8+24){3}+6{4} χ=2, group=O, 1/2B_{3}, [4,3]^{+}, (432), order 24 | 2 3 4 - 3.3.3.3.4; W17, U12, K17, C24		
I_{h}	Small snub icosicosidodecahedron Seside; V 60,E 180,F 112=(40+60){3}+12{5/2} χ=−8, group=I_{h}, [5,3], *532 | 5/2 3 3 - 3^{5}.5/2; W110, U32, K37, C41	Small retrosnub icosicosidodecahedron Sirsid; V 60,E 180,F 112=(40+60){3}+12{5/2} χ=−8, group=I_{h}, [5,3], *532 | 3/2 3/2 5/2 - (3^{5}.5/3)/2; W118, U72, K77, C91; Small inverted retrosnub icosicosidodecahedron	
I	Snub dodecahedron Snid; V 60,E 150,F 92=(20+60){3}+12{5} χ=2, group=I, 1/2H_{3}, [5,3]^{+}, (532), order 60 | 2 3 5 - 3.3.3.3.5; W18, U29, K34, C32	Snub dodecadodecahedron Siddid; V 60,E 150,F 84=60{3}+12{5}+12{5/2} χ=−6, group=I, [5,3]^{+}, 532 | 2 5/2 5 - 3.3.5/2.3.5; W111, U40, K45, C49	Inverted snub dodecadodecahedron Isdid; V 60,E 150,F 84=60{3}+12{5}+12{5/2} χ=−6, group=I, [5,3]^{+}, 532 | 5/3 2 5 - 3.3.5.3.5/3; W114, U60, K65, C76
I	Great snub icosidodecahedron Gosid; V 60,E 150,F 92=(20+60){3}+12{5/2} χ=2, group=I, [5,3]^{+}, 532 | 2 5/2 3 - 3^{4}.5/2; W113, U57, K62, C88	Great inverted snub icosidodecahedron Gisid; V 60,E 150,F 92=(20+60){3}+12{5/2} χ=2, group=I, [5,3]^{+}, 532 | 5/3 2 3 - 3^{4}.5/3; W116, U69, K74, C73	Great retrosnub icosidodecahedron Girsid; V 60,E 150,F 92=(20+60){3}+12{5/2} χ=2, group=I, [5,3]^{+}, 532 | 2 3/2 5/3 - (3^{4}.5/2)/2; W117, U74, K79, C90; Great inverted retrosnub icosidodecahedron
I	Snub icosidodecadodecahedron Sided; V 60,E 180,F 104=(20+60){3}+12{5}+12{5/2} χ=−16, group=I, [5,3]^{+}, 532 | 5/3 3 5 - 3.3.3.5.3.5/3; W112, U46, K51, C58	Great snub dodecicosidodecahedron Gisdid; V 60,E 180,F 104=(20+60){3}+(12+12){5/2} χ=−16, group=I, [5,3]^{+}, 532 | 5/3 5/2 3 - 3.3.3.5/2.3.5/3; W115, U64, K69, C80	

=== Wythoff |p q r s ===
Symmetry group
Ih	Great dirhombicosidodecahedron Gidrid; V 60,E 240,F 124=40{3}+60{4}+24{5/2} χ=−56, group=I_{h}, [5,3], *532 | 3/2 5/3 3 5/2 - 4.5/3.4.3.4.5/2.4.3/2; W119, U75, K80, C92
