= U16 =

U16 may refer to:

== Naval vessels ==
- German submarine U-16, various vessels
- HMS Amethyst (U16), a Black Swan-class sloop of the Royal Navy
- HMS Grimsby (U16), a Grimsby-class sloop of the Royal Navy
- SM U-16 (Austria-Hungary), a submarine of the Austro-Hungarian Navy

== Other uses ==
- Bugatti U-16, an automobile engine
- Cubitruncated cuboctahedron
- Small nucleolar RNA SNORD16
- Uint16_t, a 16-bit unsigned integer
- Uppland Runic Inscription 16
- U16, or under-16, is a youth sports category.
