= Great triakis icosahedron =

Polyhedron with 60 faces

Great triakis icosahedron
Type	Star polyhedron
Face	
Elements	F = 60, E = 90; V = 32 (χ = 2)
Symmetry group	I_{h}, [5,3], *532
Index references	DU_{66}
dual polyhedron	Great stellated truncated dodecahedron

3D model of a great triakis icosahedron

In geometry, the great triakis icosahedron is a nonconvex isohedral polyhedron. It is the dual of the uniform great stellated truncated dodecahedron. Its faces are isosceles triangles. Part of each triangle lies within the solid, hence is invisible in solid models.

== Proportions ==
The triangles have one angle of $\arccos(-\frac{3}{20}+\frac{3}{20}\sqrt{5})\approx 79.314\,951\,312\,25^{\circ}$ and two of $\arccos(\frac{3}{4}-\frac{1}{20}\sqrt{5})\approx 50.342\,524\,343\,87^{\circ}$. The dihedral angle equals $\arccos(\frac{-24+15\sqrt{5}}{61})\approx 81.001\,410\,024\,84^{\circ}$.

== See also ==
- Triakis icosahedron
