= Small icosacronic hexecontahedron =

Polyhedron with 60 faces

Small icosacronic hexecontahedron
| Type | Star polyhedron |
| Face | |
| Elements | F = 60, E = 120; V = 52 (χ = −8) |
| Symmetry group | I_{h}, [5,3], *532 |
| Index references | DU_{31} |
| dual polyhedron | Small icosicosidodecahedron |

3D model of a small icosacronic hexecontahedron

In geometry, the small icosacronic hexecontahedron (or small lanceal trisicosahedron) is a nonconvex isohedral polyhedron. It is the dual of the uniform small icosicosidodecahedron. Its faces are kites. Part of each kite lies inside the solid, hence is invisible in solid models.

== Proportions ==
The kites have two angles of $\arccos(\frac{3}{4}-\frac{1}{20}\sqrt{5})\approx 50.342\,524\,343\,87^{\circ}$, one of $\arccos(-\frac{1}{12}-\frac{19}{60}\sqrt{5})\approx 142.318\,554\,460\,55^{\circ}$ and one of $\arccos(-\frac{5}{12}-\frac{1}{60}\sqrt{5})\approx 116.996\,396\,851\,70^{\circ}$. The dihedral angle equals $\arccos(\frac{-44-3\sqrt{5}}{61})\approx 146.230\,659\,755\,53^{\circ}$. The ratio between the lengths of the long and short edges is $\frac{31+5\sqrt{5}}{38}\approx 1.110\,008\,944\,41$.
