= Small dodecicosacron =

Polyhedron with 60 faces

Small dodecicosacron
| Type | Star polyhedron |
| Face | |
| Elements | F = 60, E = 120; V = 32 (χ = −28) |
| Symmetry group | I_{h}, [5,3], *532 |
| Index references | DU_{50} |
| dual polyhedron | Small dodecicosahedron |

3D model of a small dodecicosacron

In geometry, the small dodecicosacron (or small dipteral trisicosahedron) is the dual of the small dodecicosahedron (U50). It is visually identical to the Small ditrigonal dodecacronic hexecontahedron. It has 60 intersecting bow-tie-shaped faces.

== Proportions ==
Each face has two angles of $\arccos(\frac{5}{12}+\frac{1}{4}\sqrt{5})\approx 12.661\,078\,804\,43^{\circ}$ and two angles of $\arccos(-\frac{3}{4}+\frac{1}{20}\sqrt{5})\approx 129.657\,475\,656\,13^{\circ}$. The diagonals of each antiparallelogram intersect at an angle of $\arccos(\frac{1}{12}+\frac{19}{60}\sqrt{5})\approx 37.681\,445\,539\,45^{\circ}$. The dihedral angle equals $\arccos(\frac{-44-3\sqrt{5}}{61})\approx 146.230\,659\,755\,53^{\circ}$. The ratio between the lengths of the long edges and the short ones equals $\frac{1}{2}+\frac{1}{2}\sqrt{5}$, which is the golden ratio. Part of each face lies inside the solid, hence is invisible in solid models.
