= Small ditrigonal dodecacronic hexecontahedron =

Polyhedron with 60 faces

Small ditrigonal dodecacronic hexecontahedron
Type	Star polyhedron
Face	
Elements	F = 60, E = 120; V = 44 (χ = −16)
Symmetry group	I_{h}, [5,3], *532
Index references	DU_{43}
dual polyhedron	Small ditrigonal dodecicosidodecahedron

3D model of a small ditrigonal dodecacronic hexecontahedron

In geometry, the small ditrigonal dodecacronic hexecontahedron (or fat star) is a nonconvex isohedral polyhedron. It is the dual of the uniform small ditrigonal dodecicosidodecahedron. It is visually identical to the small dodecicosacron. Its faces are darts. A part of each dart lies inside the solid, hence is invisible in solid models.

== Proportions ==
Faces have two angles of $\arccos(\frac{5}{12}+\frac{1}{4}\sqrt{5})\approx 12.661\,078\,804\,43^{\circ}$, one of $\arccos(-\frac{5}{12}-\frac{1}{60}\sqrt{5})\approx 116.996\,396\,851\,70^{\circ}$ and one of $360^{\circ}-\arccos(-\frac{1}{12}-\frac{19}{60}\sqrt{5})\approx 217.681\,445\,539\,45^{\circ}$. Its dihedral angles equal $\arccos({\frac{-44-3\sqrt{5}}{61}})\approx 146.230\,659\,755\,53^{\circ}$. The ratio between the lengths of the long and short edges is $\frac{31+5\sqrt{5}}{38}\approx 1.110\,008\,944\,41$.
