= Small ditrigonal dodecicosidodecahedron =

Polyhedron with 44 faces

Small ditrigonal dodecicosidodecahedron
Type	Uniform star polyhedron
Elements	F = 44, E = 120; V = 60 (χ = −16)
Faces by sides	20{3}+12{5/2}+12{10}
Coxeter diagram	
Wythoff symbol	5/3 3 | 5; 5/2 3/2 | 5
Symmetry group	I_{h}, [5,3], *532
Index references	U_{43}, C_{55}, W_{82}
Dual polyhedron	Small ditrigonal dodecacronic hexecontahedron
Vertex figure	3.10.5/3.10
Bowers acronym	Sidditdid

3D model of a small ditrigonal dodecicosidodecahedron

In geometry, the small ditrigonal dodecicosidodecahedron (or small dodekified icosidodecahedron) is a nonconvex uniform polyhedron, indexed as U_{43}. It has 44 faces (20 triangles, 12 pentagrams and 12 decagons), 120 edges, and 60 vertices. Its vertex figure is a crossed quadrilateral.

== Related polyhedra ==
It shares its vertex arrangement with the great stellated truncated dodecahedron. It additionally shares its edges with the small icosicosidodecahedron (having the triangular and pentagrammic faces in common) and the small dodecicosahedron (having the decagonal faces in common).

Great stellated truncated dodecahedron	Small icosicosidodecahedron	Small ditrigonal dodecicosidodecahedron	Small dodecicosahedron

== See also ==
- List of uniform polyhedra
