= German submarine U-16 =

U-16 may refer to one of the following German submarines:

- SM U-16 (Germany), was a unique submarine; launched in 1911 and served in the First World War until sunk in an accident on 8 February 1919, en route to surrender
  - During the First World War, Germany also had these submarines with similar names:
    - SM UB-16, a Type UB I submarine launched in 1915 and sunk 10 May 1918
    - SM UC-16, a Type UC II submarine launched in 1916 and lost in October 1917
- German submarine U-16 (1936), a Type IIB submarine that served in the Second World War and was sunk on 25 October 1939
- German submarine U-16 (S195), a Type 206 submarine of the Bundesmarine that was launched in 1973 and was sold to Columbia after decommissioning in 2011 for spare parts.
