= Great truncated icosidodecahedron =

Polyhedron with 62 faces

Great truncated icosidodecahedron
Type	Uniform star polyhedron
Elements	F = 62, E = 180; V = 120 (χ = 2)
Faces by sides	30{4}+20{6}+12{10/3}
Coxeter diagram	
Wythoff symbol	2 3 5/3 |
Symmetry group	I_{h}, [5,3], *532
Index references	U_{68}, C_{87}, W_{108}
Dual polyhedron	Great disdyakis triacontahedron
Vertex figure	4.6.10/3
Bowers acronym	Gaquatid

3D model of a great truncated icosidodecahedron

In geometry, the great truncated icosidodecahedron (or great quasitruncated icosidodecahedron or stellatruncated icosidodecahedron) is a nonconvex uniform polyhedron, indexed as U_{68}. It has 62 faces (30 squares, 20 hexagons, and 12 decagrams), 180 edges, and 120 vertices. It is given a Schläfli symbol t_{0,1,2}{5/3,3}, and Coxeter-Dynkin diagram,.

== Cartesian coordinates ==
Cartesian coordinates for the vertices of a great truncated icosidodecahedron centered at the origin are all the even permutations of
$$\begin{array}{ccclc}
\Bigl(& \pm\,\varphi,& \pm\,\varphi,& \pm \bigl[3-\frac{1}{\varphi}\bigr] &\Bigr),\\
\Bigl(& \pm\,2\varphi,& \pm\,\frac{1}{\varphi},& \pm\,\frac{1}{\varphi^3} &\Bigl), \\
\Bigl(& \pm\,\varphi,& \pm\,\frac{1}{\varphi^2},& \pm \bigl[1+\frac{3}{\varphi}\bigr] &\Bigr), \\
\Bigl(& \pm\,\sqrt{5},& \pm\,2,& \pm\,\frac{\sqrt{5}}{\varphi} &\Bigr), \\
\Bigl(& \pm\,\frac{1}{\varphi},& \pm\,3,& \pm\,\frac{2}{\varphi} &\Bigr),
\end{array}$$

where $\varphi = \tfrac{1 + \sqrt 5}{2}$ is the golden ratio.

== Related polyhedra ==
=== Great disdyakis triacontahedron ===
Great disdyakis triacontahedron
Type	Star polyhedron
Face	
Elements	F = 120, E = 180; V = 62 (χ = 2)
Symmetry group	I_{h}, [5,3], *532
Index references	DU_{68}
dual polyhedron	Great truncated icosidodecahedron

3D model of a great disdyakis triacontahedron

The great disdyakis triacontahedron (or trisdyakis icosahedron) is a nonconvex isohedral polyhedron. It is the dual of the great truncated icosidodecahedron. Its faces are triangles.

==== Proportions ====
The triangles have one angle of $\arccos\left(\tfrac{1}{6}+\tfrac{1}{15}\sqrt{5}\right) \approx 71.594\,636\,220\,88^{\circ}$, one of $\arccos\left(\tfrac{3}{4}+\tfrac{1}{10}\sqrt{5}\right) \approx 13.192\,999\,040\,74^{\circ}$ and one of $\arccos\left(\tfrac{3}{8}-\tfrac{5}{24}\sqrt{5}\right) \approx 95.212\,364\,738\,38^{\circ}.$ The dihedral angle equals $\arccos\left(\tfrac{-179+24\sqrt{5}}{241}\right) \approx 121.336\,250\,807\,39^{\circ}.$ Part of each triangle lies within the solid, hence is invisible in solid models.

== See also ==
- List of uniform polyhedra
