= Small nucleolar RNA SNORD16 =

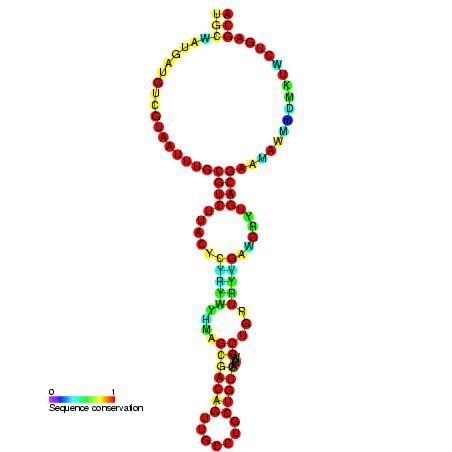
- Predicted secondary structure and sequence conservation of SNORD16

Identifiers
- Symbol: SNORD16
- Alt. Symbols: U16
- Rfam: RF00138

Other data
- RNA type: Gene; snRNA; snoRNA; C/D-box
- Domain: Eukaryota
- GO: GO:0006396 GO:0005730
- SO: SO:0000593
- PDB structures: PDBe

In molecular biology, snoRNA U16 (also known as SNORD16) is a non-coding RNA (ncRNA) molecule which functions in the modification of other small nuclear RNAs (snRNAs). This type of modifying RNA is usually located in the nucleolus of the eukaryotic cell which is a major site of snRNA biogenesis. It is known as a small nucleolar RNA (snoRNA) and also often referred to as a guide RNA.

snoRNA U16 belongs to the C/D box class of snoRNAs which contain the conserved sequence motifs known as the C box (UGAUGA) and the D box (CUGA). Most of the members of the box C/D family function in directing site-specific 2'-O-methylation of substrate RNAs.

U16 is predicted to guide the 2'O-ribose methylation of 18S ribosomal RNA (rRNA) residue A484 and is encoded within an intron of the gene for ribosomal proteins L1 in animals. This snoRNA was independently named MBII-98 in mouse.
