= Small dodecicosahedron =

Polyhedron with 32 faces

Small dodecicosahedron
Type	Uniform star polyhedron
Elements	F = 32, E = 120; V = 60 (χ = −28)
Faces by sides	20{6}+12{10}
Coxeter diagram	(with extra double-covered triangles) (with extra double-covered pentagrams)
Wythoff symbol	3 5 (3/2 5/4) |
Symmetry group	I_{h}, [5,3], *532
Index references	U_{50}, C_{64}, W_{90}
Dual polyhedron	Small dodecicosacron
Vertex figure	6.10.6/5.10/9
Bowers acronym	Siddy

3D model of a small dodecicosahedron

In geometry, the small dodecicosahedron (or small dodekicosahedron) is a nonconvex uniform polyhedron, indexed as U_{50}. It has 32 faces (20 hexagons and 12 decagons), 120 edges, and 60 vertices. Its vertex figure is a crossed quadrilateral.

== Related polyhedra ==
It shares its vertex arrangement with the great stellated truncated dodecahedron. It additionally shares its edges with the small icosicosidodecahedron (having the hexagonal faces in common) and the small ditrigonal dodecicosidodecahedron (having the decagonal faces in common).

Great stellated truncated dodecahedron	Small icosicosidodecahedron	Small ditrigonal dodecicosidodecahedron	Small dodecicosahedron
