= Small icosicosidodecahedron =

Polyhedron

Small icosicosidodecahedron
Type	Uniform star polyhedron
Elements	F = 52, E = 120; V = 60 (χ = −8)
Faces by sides	20{3}+12{5/2}+20{6}
Coxeter diagram	
Wythoff symbol	5/2 3 | 3
Symmetry group	I_{h}, [5,3], *532
Index references	U_{31}, C_{40}, W_{71}
Dual polyhedron	Small icosacronic hexecontahedron
Vertex figure	6.5/2.6.3
Bowers acronym	Siid

3D model of a small icosicosidodecahedron

In geometry, the small icosicosidodecahedron (or small icosified icosidodecahedron) is a nonconvex uniform polyhedron, indexed as U_{31}. It has 52 faces (20 triangles, 12 pentagrams, and 20 hexagons), 120 edges, and 60 vertices.

== Related polyhedra ==
It shares its vertex arrangement with the great stellated truncated dodecahedron. It additionally shares its edges with the small ditrigonal dodecicosidodecahedron (having the triangular and pentagrammic faces in common) and the small dodecicosahedron (having the hexagonal faces in common).

Great stellated truncated dodecahedron	Small icosicosidodecahedron	Small ditrigonal dodecicosidodecahedron	Small dodecicosahedron

== See also ==
- List of uniform polyhedra
