= Cubitruncated cuboctahedron =

Polyhedron with 20 faces

Cubitruncated cuboctahedron
Type	Uniform star polyhedron
Elements	F = 20, E = 72; V = 48 (χ = −4)
Faces by sides	8{6}+6{8}+6{8/3}
Coxeter diagram	
Wythoff symbol	3 4 4/3 |
Symmetry group	O_{h}, [4,3], *432
Index references	U_{16}, C_{52}, W_{79}
Dual polyhedron	Tetradyakis hexahedron
Vertex figure	6.8.8/3
Bowers acronym	Cotco

3D model of a cubitruncated cuboctahedron

In geometry, the cubitruncated cuboctahedron or cuboctatruncated cuboctahedron is a nonconvex uniform polyhedron, indexed as U_{16}. It has 20 faces (8 hexagons, 6 octagons, and 6 octagrams), 72 edges, and 48 vertices, and has a shäfli symbol of tr{4,^{3}/_{2}}

== Convex hull ==
Its convex hull is a nonuniform truncated cuboctahedron.

Convex hull	Cubitruncated cuboctahedron

== Orthogonal projection ==
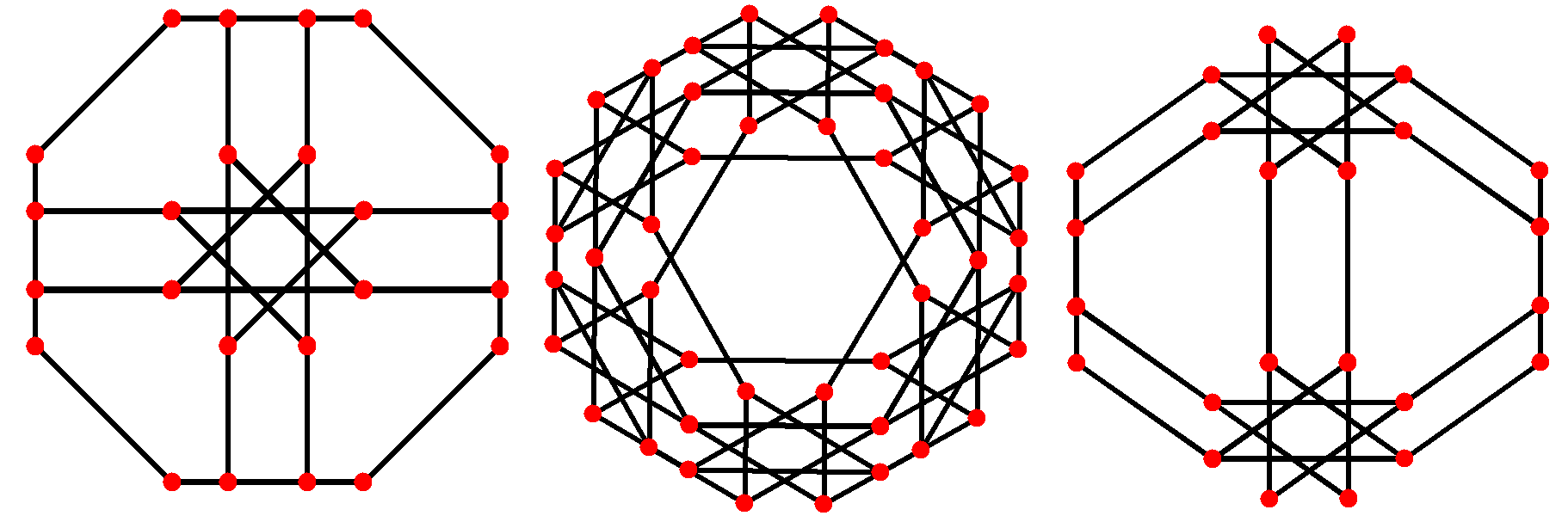

== Cartesian coordinates ==
Cartesian coordinates for the vertices of a cubitruncated cuboctahedron are all the permutations of

(±(√2−1), ±1, ±(√2+1))

== Related polyhedra ==
=== Tetradyakis hexahedron ===
Tetradyakis hexahedron
Type	Star polyhedron
Face	
Elements	F = 48, E = 72; V = 20 (χ = −4)
Symmetry group	O_{h}, [4,3], *432
Index references	DU_{16}
dual polyhedron	Cubitruncated cuboctahedron

3D model of a tetradyakis hexahedron

The tetradyakis hexahedron (or great disdyakis dodecahedron) is a nonconvex isohedral polyhedron. It has 48 intersecting scalene triangle faces, 72 edges, and 20 vertices.

==== Proportions ====
The triangles have one angle of $\arccos(\frac{3}{4})\approx 41.409\,622\,109\,27^{\circ}$, one of $\arccos(\frac{1}{6}+\frac{7}{12}\sqrt{2})\approx 7.420\,694\,647\,42^{\circ}$ and one of $\arccos(\frac{1}{6}-\frac{7}{12}\sqrt{2})\approx 131.169\,683\,243\,31^{\circ}$. The dihedral angle equals $\arccos(-\frac{5}{7})\approx 135.584\,691\,402\,81^{\circ}$. Part of each triangle lies within the solid, hence is invisible in solid models.

It is the dual of the uniform cubitruncated cuboctahedron.

== See also ==
- List of uniform polyhedra
