= Great stellated truncated dodecahedron =

Polyhedron with 32 faces

Great stellated truncated dodecahedron
Type	Uniform star polyhedron
Elements	F = 32, E = 90; V = 60 (χ = 2)
Faces by sides	20{3}+12{10/3}
Coxeter diagram	
Wythoff symbol	2 3 | 5/3
Symmetry group	I_{h}, [5,3], *532
Index references	U_{66}, C_{83}, W_{104}
Dual polyhedron	Great triakis icosahedron
Vertex figure	3.10/3.10/3
Bowers acronym	Quit Gissid

3D model of a great stellated truncated dodecahedron

In geometry, the great stellated truncated dodecahedron (or quasitruncated great stellated dodecahedron or great stellatruncated dodecahedron) is a nonconvex uniform polyhedron, indexed as U_{66}. It has 32 faces (20 triangles and 12 decagrams), 90 edges, and 60 vertices. It is given a Schläfli symbol t_{0,1}{5/3,3}.

== Related polyhedra ==
It shares its vertex arrangement with three other uniform polyhedra: the small icosicosidodecahedron, the small ditrigonal dodecicosidodecahedron, and the small dodecicosahedron:

Great stellated truncated dodecahedron	Small icosicosidodecahedron	Small ditrigonal dodecicosidodecahedron	Small dodecicosahedron

== Cartesian coordinates ==
Cartesian coordinates for the vertices of a great stellated truncated dodecahedron are all the even permutations of $\begin{array}{crclc} \Bigl(& 0,& \pm\,\varphi,& \pm \bigl[2-\frac{1}{\varphi}\bigr] &\Bigr) \\ \Bigl(& \pm\,\varphi,& \pm\,\frac{1}{\varphi},& \pm\,\frac{2}{\varphi} &\Bigr) \\ \Bigl(& \pm\,\frac{1}{\varphi^2},& \pm\,\frac{1}{\varphi},& \pm\,2 &\Bigr) \end{array}$

where $\varphi = \tfrac{1+\sqrt 5}{2}$ is the golden ratio.

== See also ==
- List of uniform polyhedra
