= Tetrakis =

Tetrakis may refer to:

- Tetrakis (Paphlagonia), an ancient Greek city
- Tetrakis cuboctahedron, convex polyhedron with 32 triangular faces
- Tetrakis hexahedron, an Archimedean dual solid or a Catalan solid
- Tetrakis square tiling, a tiling of the Euclidean plane
- Tetrakis(triphenylphosphine)palladium(0), a catalyst in organic chemistry

== See also ==
- Tetracus
- Tetrakis legomenon, a word that occurs only four times within a context
- Tetricus (disambiguation)
- Tetrix (disambiguation)
- Truncated tetrakis cube, a convex polyhedron with 32 faces
