= Triakis truncated tetrahedron =

Space-filling polyhedron with 16 faces

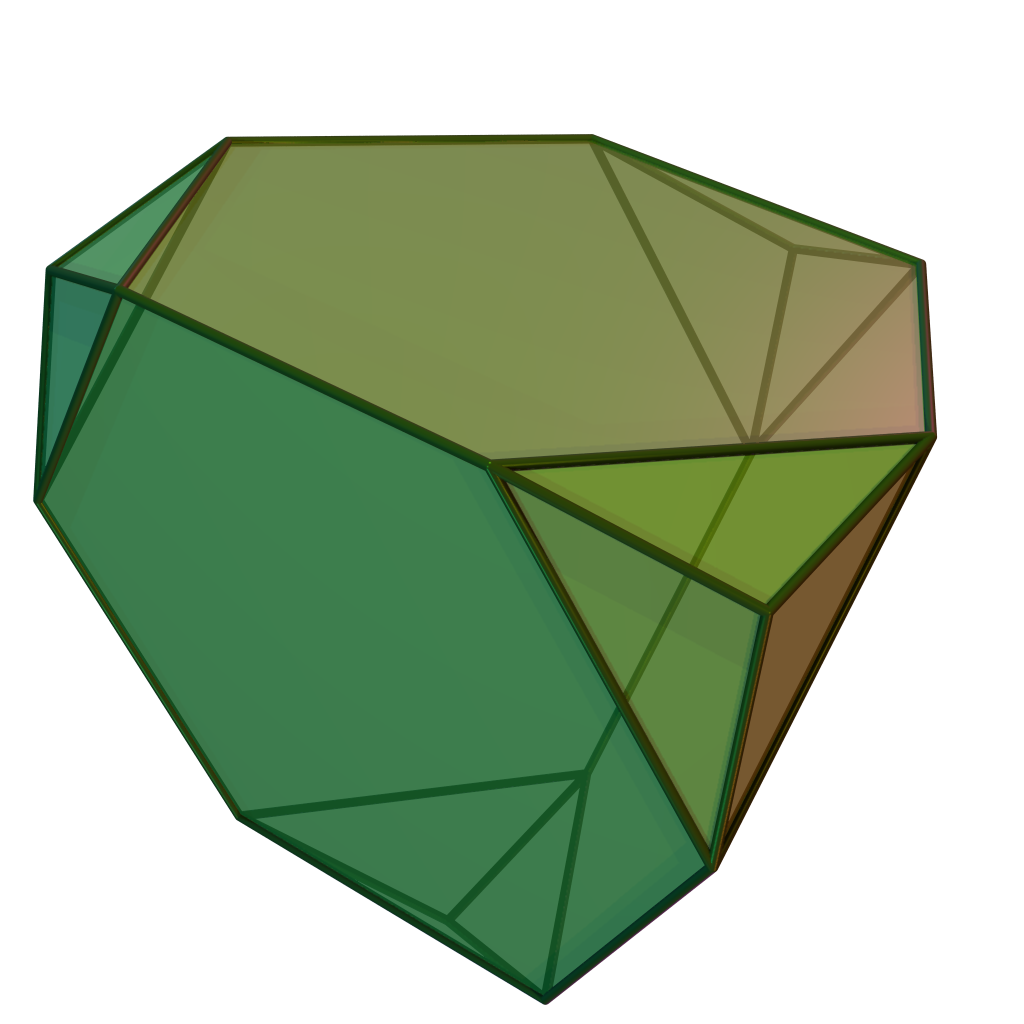
- Type: Plesiohedron
- Faces: 4 hexagons 12 isosceles triangles
- Edges: 30
- Vertices: 16
- Conway notation: k3tT
- Dual polyhedron: 16|Order-3 truncated triakis tetrahedron
- Properties: convex

In geometry, the triakis truncated tetrahedron is a convex polyhedron made from 4 hexagons and 12 isosceles triangles. It can be used to tessellate three-dimensional space, making the triakis truncated tetrahedral honeycomb.

The triakis truncated tetrahedron is the shape of the Voronoi cell of the carbon atoms in diamond, which lie on the diamond cubic crystal structure. As the Voronoi cell of a symmetric space pattern, it is a plesiohedron.

== Construction ==
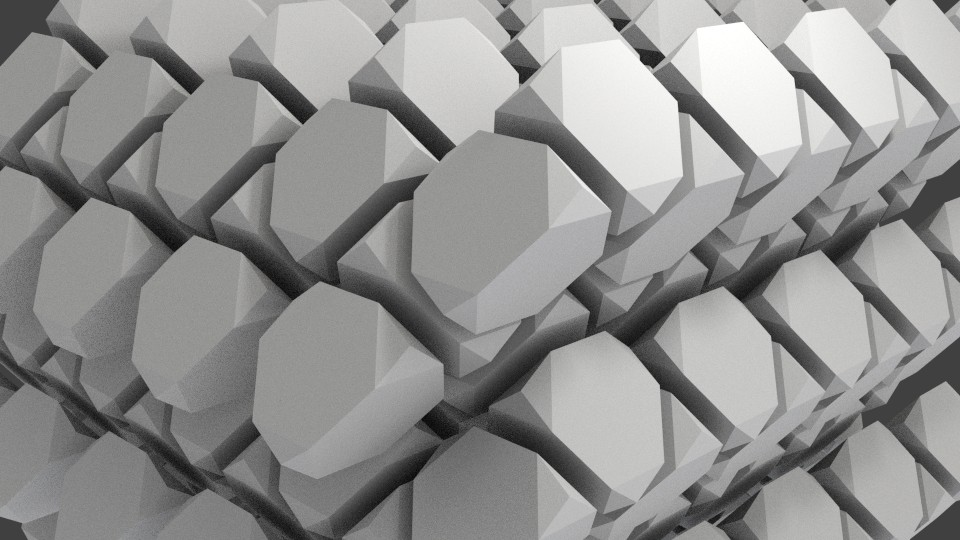
Triakis truncated tetrahedral honeycomb

For space-filling, the triakis truncated tetrahedron can be constructed as follows:

1. Truncate a regular tetrahedron such that the big faces are regular hexagons.
2. Add an extra vertex at the center of each of the four smaller tetrahedra that were removed.

== See also ==
- Quarter cubic honeycomb
- Truncated tetrahedron
- Triakis tetrahedron
