= Pentahexagonal pyritoheptacontatetrahedron =

Near-miss Johnson solid with 74 faces

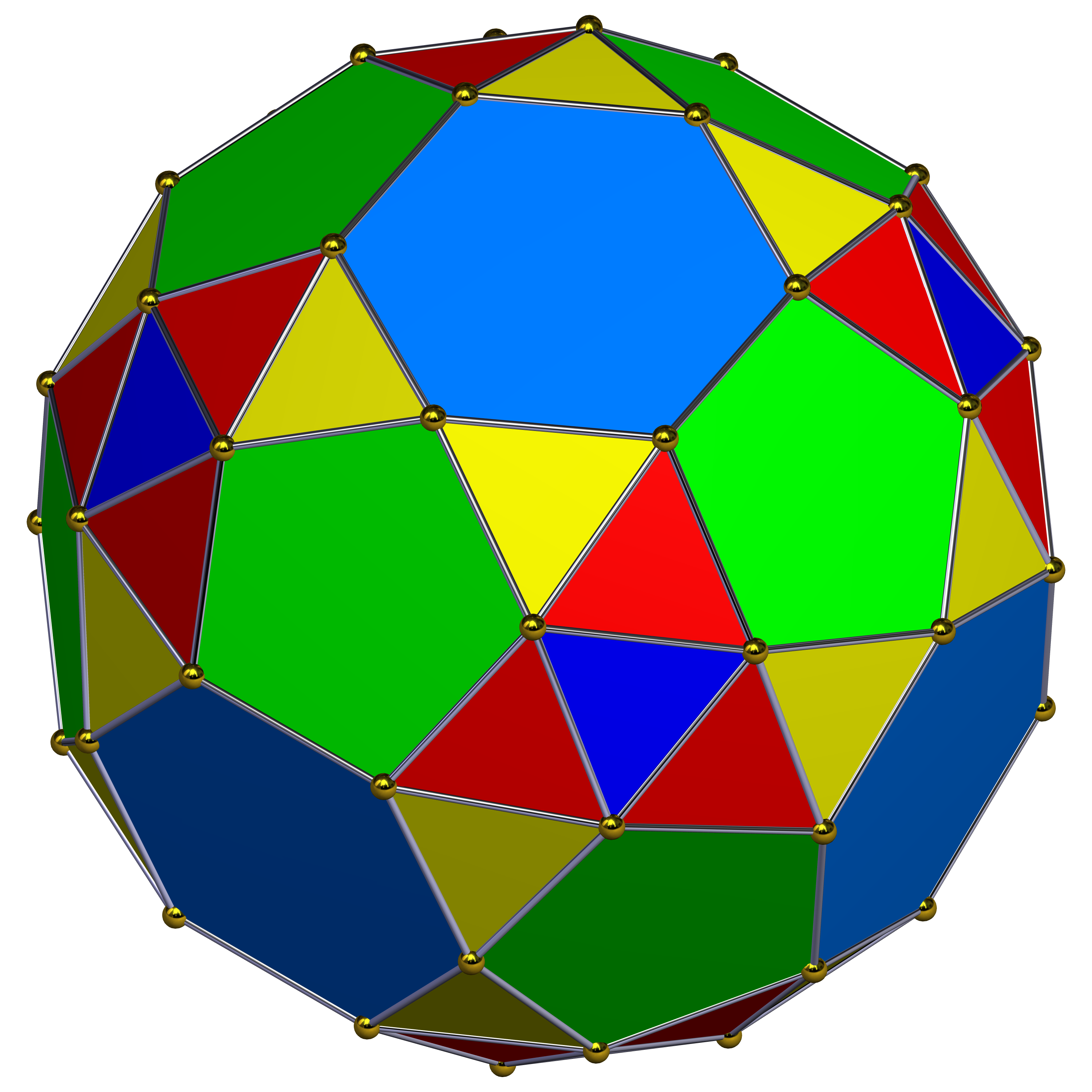
- Type: Near-miss Johnson solid Symmetrohedron
- Faces: 74: 6 hexagons 12 pentagons 8+24+24 non-equilateral triangles
- Edges: 132
- Vertices: 60
- Vertex configuration: 3.3.5.6; 3.5.3.6; 3.3.3.3.5
- Symmetry group: T_{h}, [3^{+},4], (3*2), order 24
- Rotation group: T, [3,3]^{+}, (332), order 12
- Properties: convex

Net
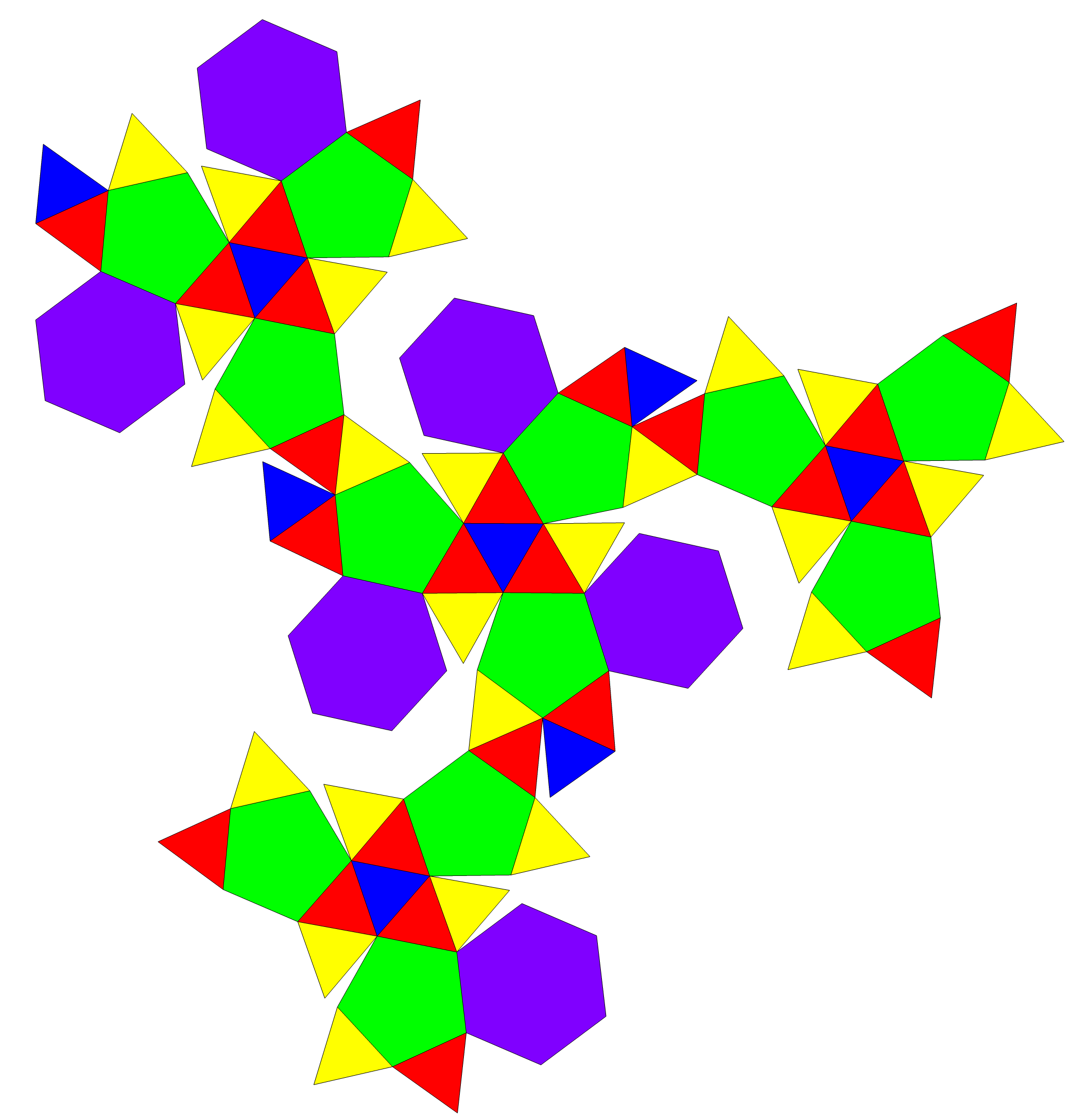

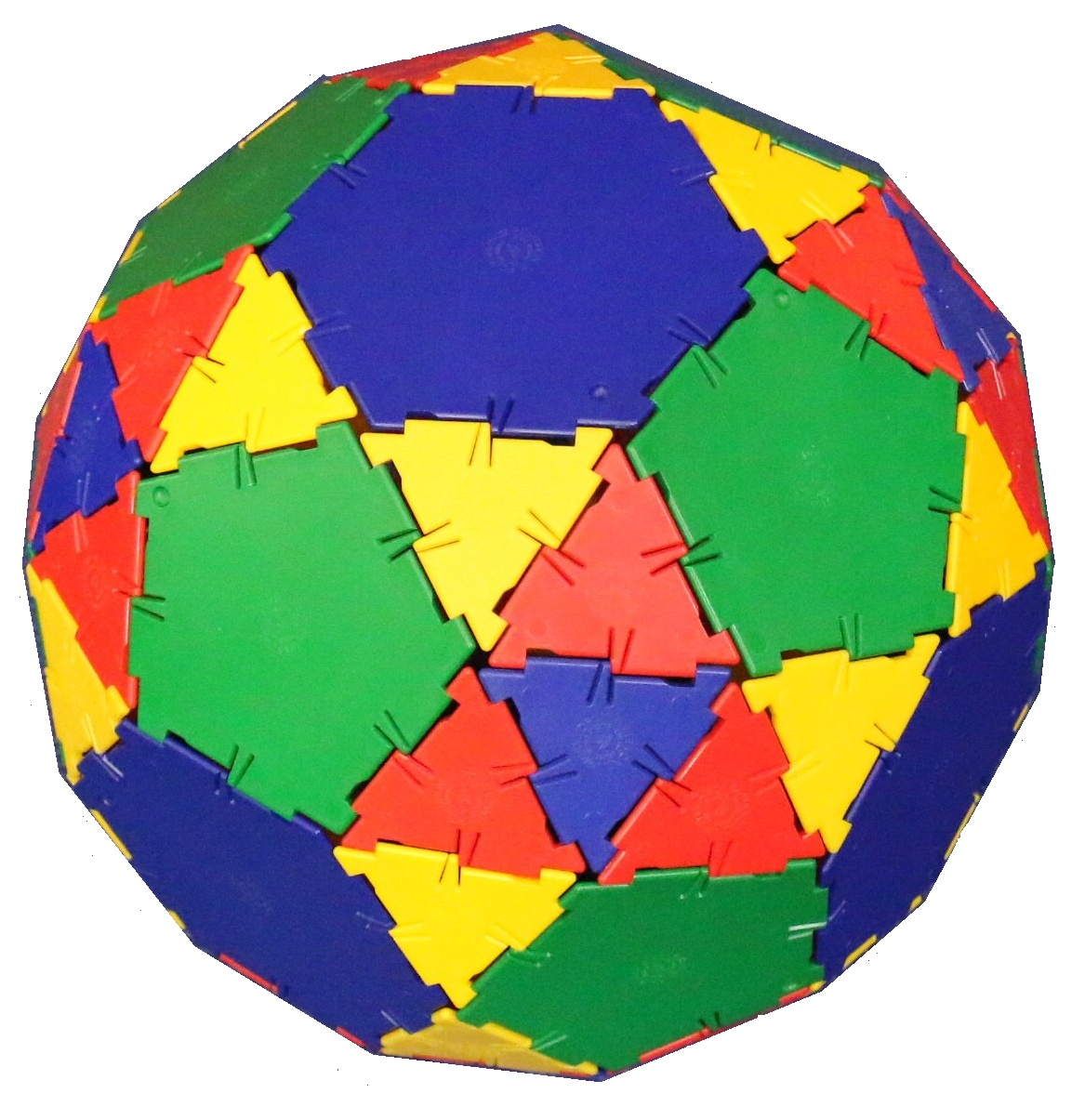
Model built with polydron

In geometry, a pentahexagonal pyritoheptacontatetrahedron is a near-miss Johnson solid with pyritohedral symmetry. This near-miss was discovered by Mason Green in 2006. It has 6 hexagonal faces, 12 pentagonal faces, and 56 triangles in 3 symmetry positions. Mason calls it a hexagonally expanded snubbed dodecahedron.

With regular hexagons and pentagons it is a symmetrohedron. The triangles are not equilateral, with triangle-triangle edges compressed by 1.8%.

It has 3 vertex configurations, 3.3.5.6, 3.5.3.6, 3.3.3.3.5, with the last shared in the snub dodecahedron.

== Dual Polyhedron ==
The dual of the pentahexagonal pyritoheptacontatetrahedron is made of kites, quadrilaterals, and pentagonal faces. It has 60 faces.

Image	Animation

== See also ==
- Tetrated dodecahedron has tetrahedral symmetry
