= Near-miss Johnson solid =

Convex polyhedron whose faces are almost regular polygons

In geometry, a near-miss Johnson solid is a convex polyhedron whose faces are close to being regular polygons but some or all of which are not precisely regular. Thus, it fails to meet the definition of a Johnson solid, a polyhedron whose faces are all regular, though it "can often be physically constructed without noticing the discrepancy" between its regular and irregular faces. The precise number of near-misses depends on how closely the faces of such a polyhedron are required to approximate regular polygons. Because "close to" is not precisely defined, the notion of near-miss Johnson solid is not precisely defined either.

Some near-misses with high symmetry are also symmetrohedra with some truly regular polygon faces.

Some near-misses are also zonohedra.

== Examples ==
Name Conway name	Image	Vertex configurations	V	E	F	F_{3}	F_{4}	F_{5}	F_{6}	F_{8}	F_{10}	F_{12}	Symmetry
Associahedron $K_5$ t4dP3		2 (5.5.5); 12 (4.5.5)	14	21	9		3	6					Dih_{3} order 12
Truncated triakis tetrahedron t6kT		4 (5.5.5); 24 (5.5.6)	28	42	16			12	4				T_{d}, [3,3] order 24
Pentahexagonal pyritoheptacontatetrahedron		12 (3.5.3.6); 24 (3.3.5.6); 24 (3.3.3.3.5)	60	132	74	56		12	6				T_{h}, [3^{+},4] order 24
Chamfered cube cC		24 (4.6.6); 8 (6.6.6)	32	48	18		6		12				O_{h}, [4,3] order 48
--		12 (5.5.6); 6 (3.5.3.5); 12 (3.3.5.5)	30	54	26	12		12	2				D_{6h}, [6,2] order 24
--		6 (5.5.5); 9 (3.5.3.5); 12 (3.3.5.5)	27	51	26	14		12					D_{3h}, [3,2] order 12
Tetrated dodecahedron		4 (5.5.5); 12 (3.5.3.5); 12 (3.3.5.5)	28	54	28	16		12					T_{d}, [3,3] order 24
Chamfered dodecahedron cD		60 (5.6.6); 20 (6.6.6)	80	120	42			12	30				I_{h}, [5,3] order 120
Rectified truncated icosahedron atI		60 (3.5.3.6); 30 (3.6.3.6)	90	180	92	60		12	20				I_{h}, [5,3] order 120
Truncated truncated icosahedron ttI		120 (3.10.12); 60 (3.12.12)	180	270	92	60					12	20	I_{h}, [5,3] order 120
Expanded truncated icosahedron etI		60 (3.4.5.4); 120 (3.4.6.4)	180	360	182	60	90	12	20				I_{h}, [5,3] order 120
Snub rectified truncated icosahedron stI		60 (3.3.3.3.5); 120 (3.3.3.3.6)	180	450	272	240		12	20				I, [5,3]^{+} order 60

== Coplanar misses ==
Some failed Johnson solid candidates have coplanar faces. These polyhedra can be perturbed to become convex with faces that are arbitrarily close to regular polygons. These cases use 4.4.4.4 vertex figures of the square tiling, 3.3.3.3.3.3 vertex figure of the triangular tiling, as well as 60 degree rhombi divided double equilateral triangle faces, or a 60 degree trapezoid as three equilateral triangles. It is possible to take an infinite amount of distinct coplanar misses from sections of the cubic honeycomb (alternatively convex polycubes) or alternated cubic honeycomb, ignoring any obscured faces.

Examples: 3.3.3.3.3.3

Rhombic prism

Wedge

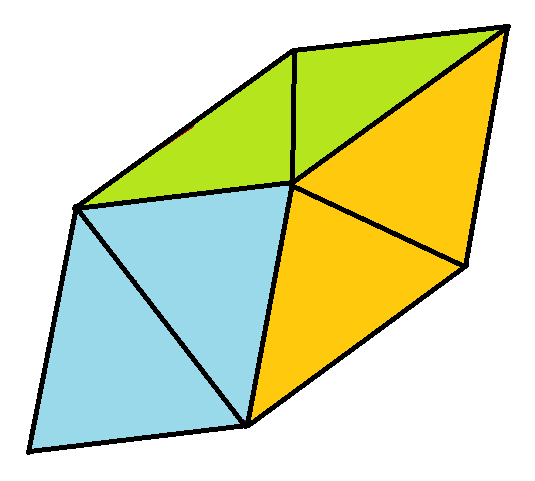
Trigonal trapezohedron

Gyroelongated trigonal pyramid

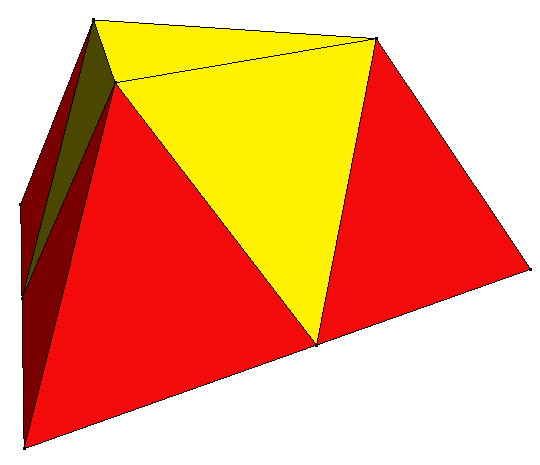
Triangulated monorectified tetrahedron

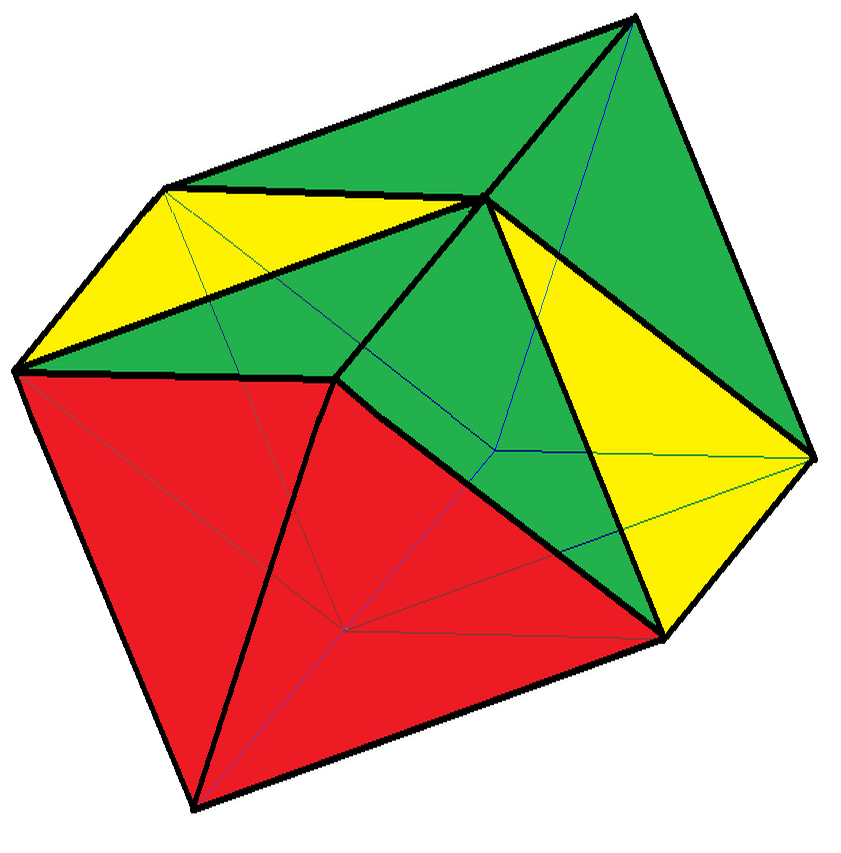
Elongated octahedron

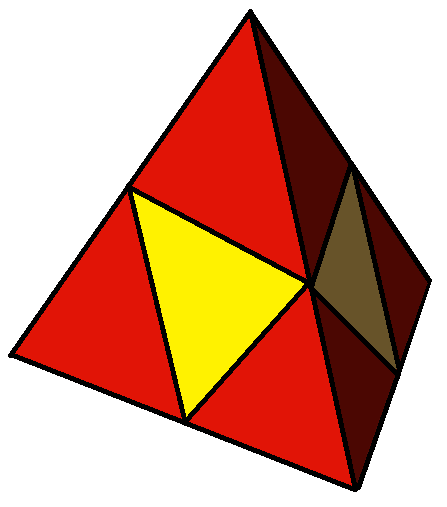
Tetratetrahedron, triangulated tetrahedron

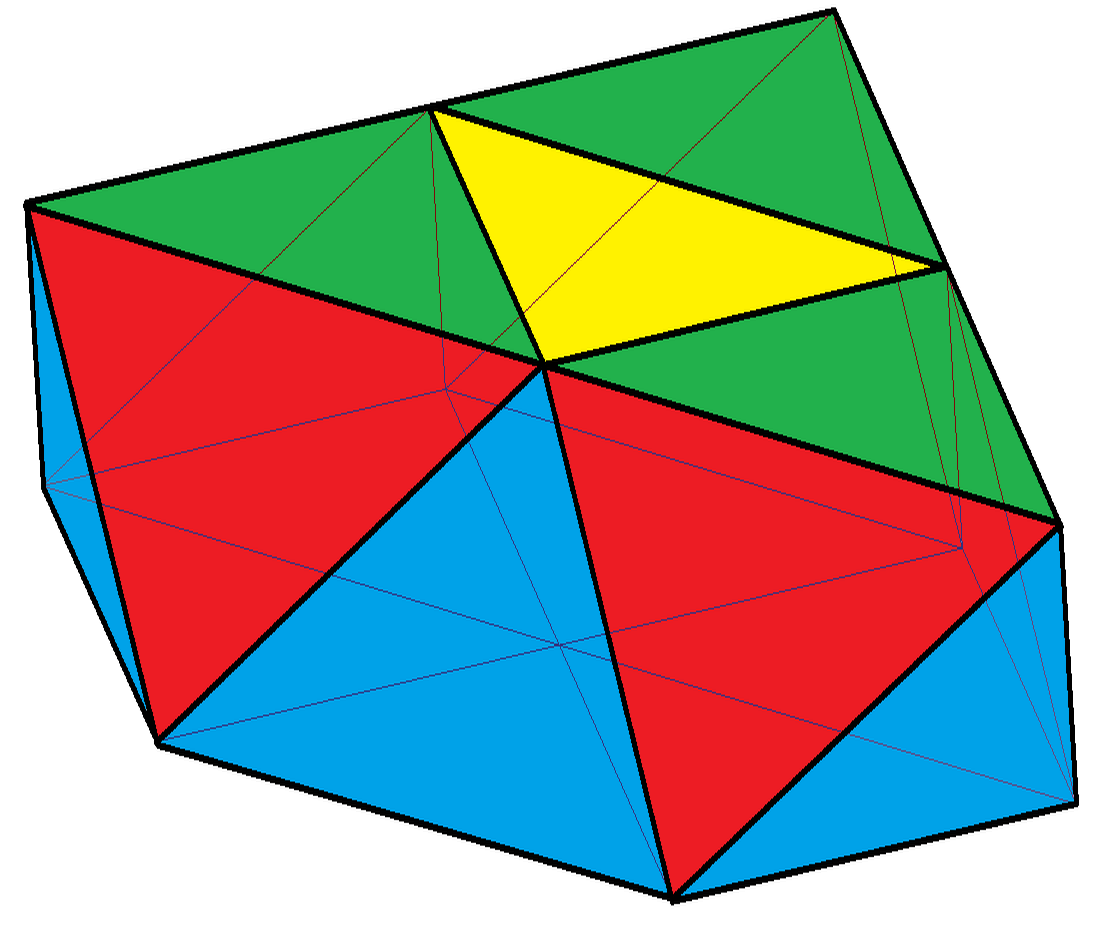
Augmented triangular cupola

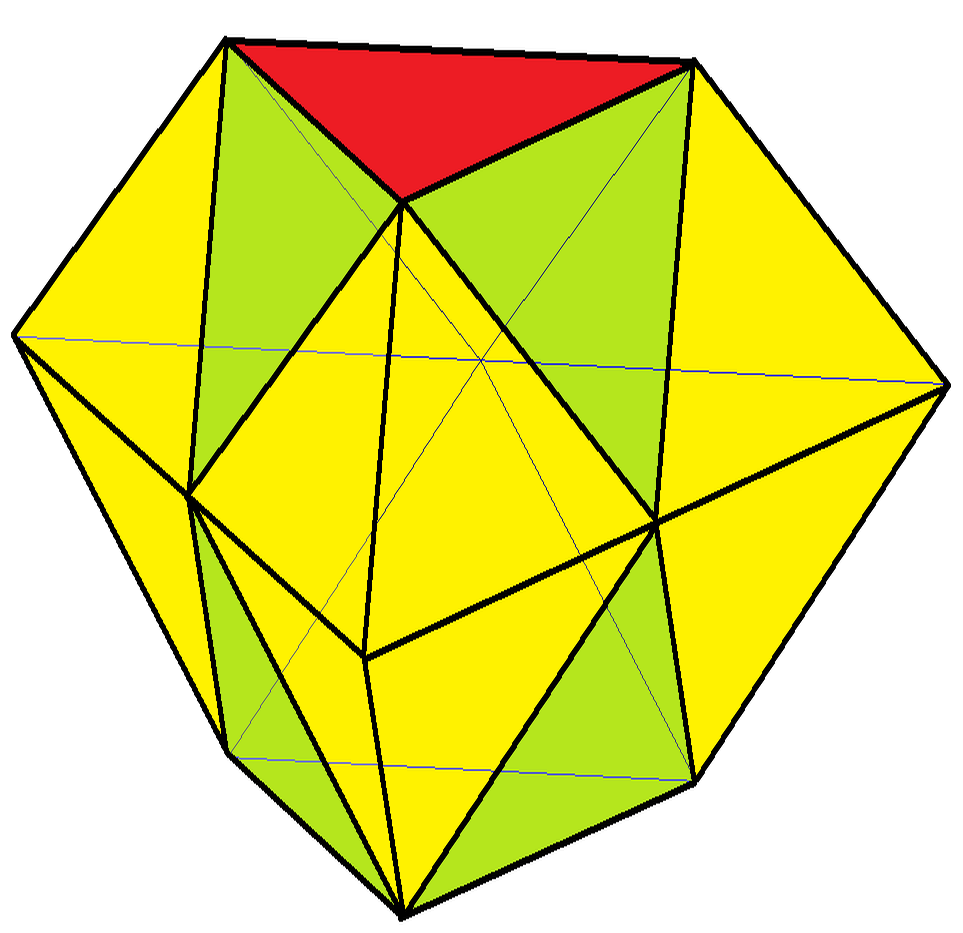
Triangulated truncated triangular bipyramid

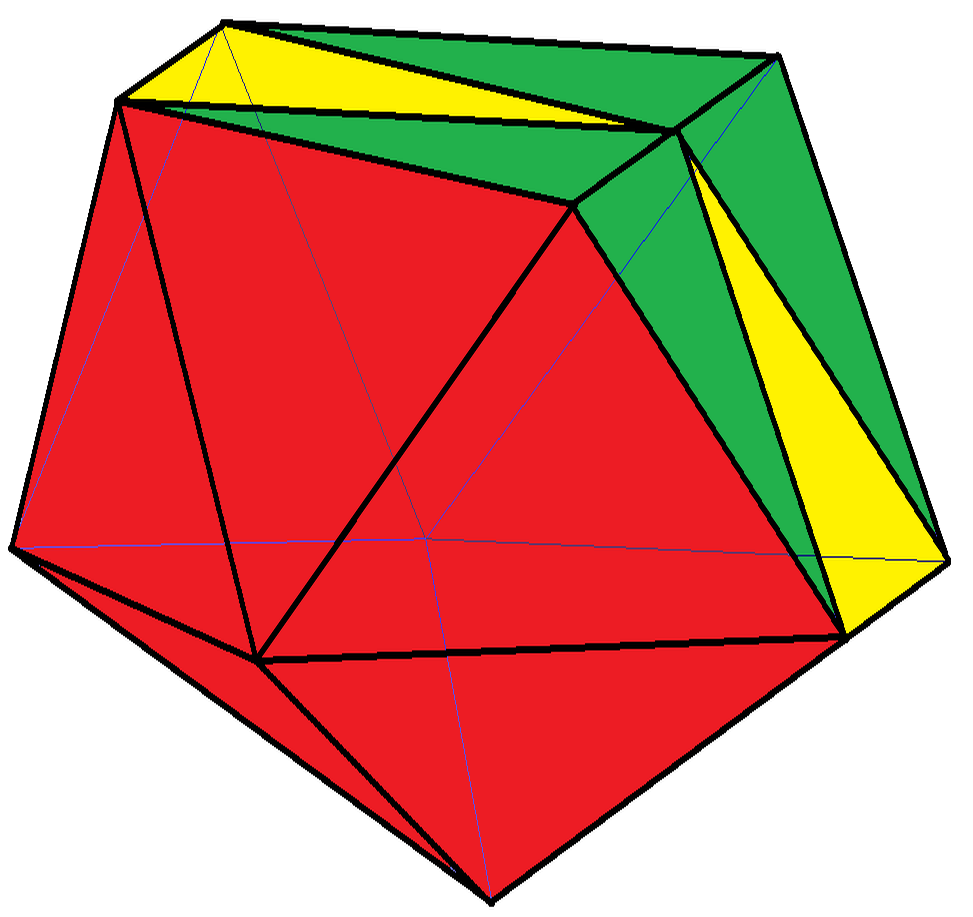
Edge-contracted icosahedron

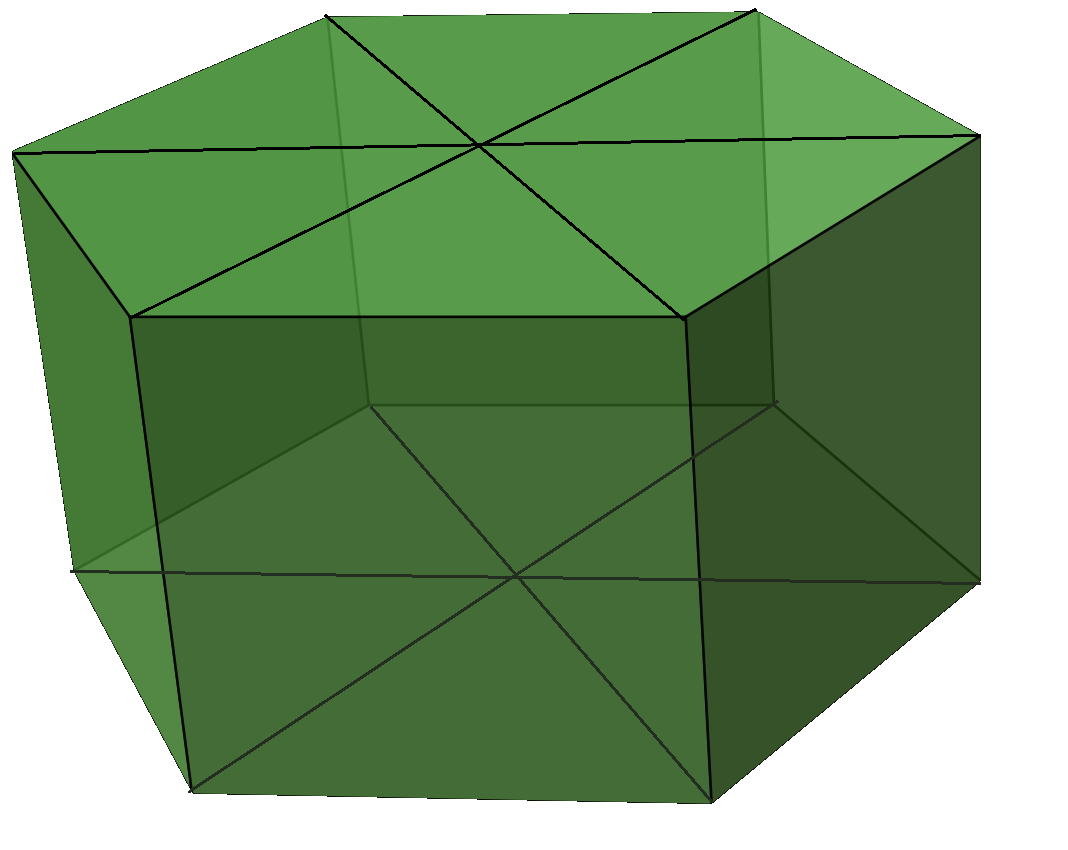
Hexagonal prism

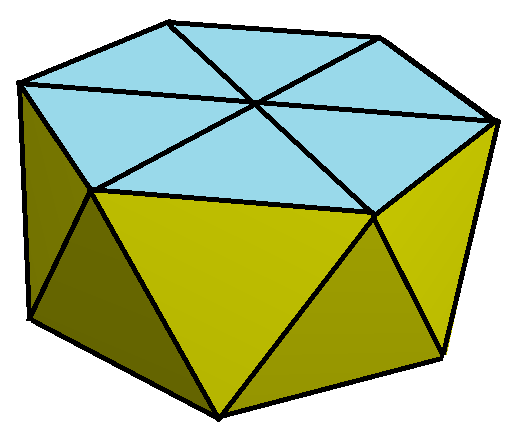
Hexagonal antiprism,
Gyroelongated hexagonal pyramid

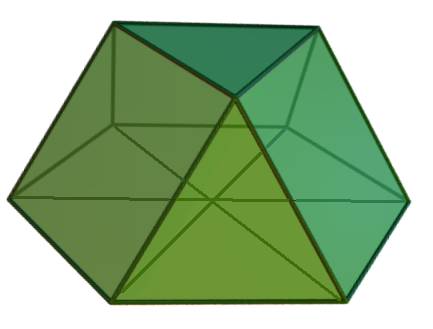
Triangular cupola

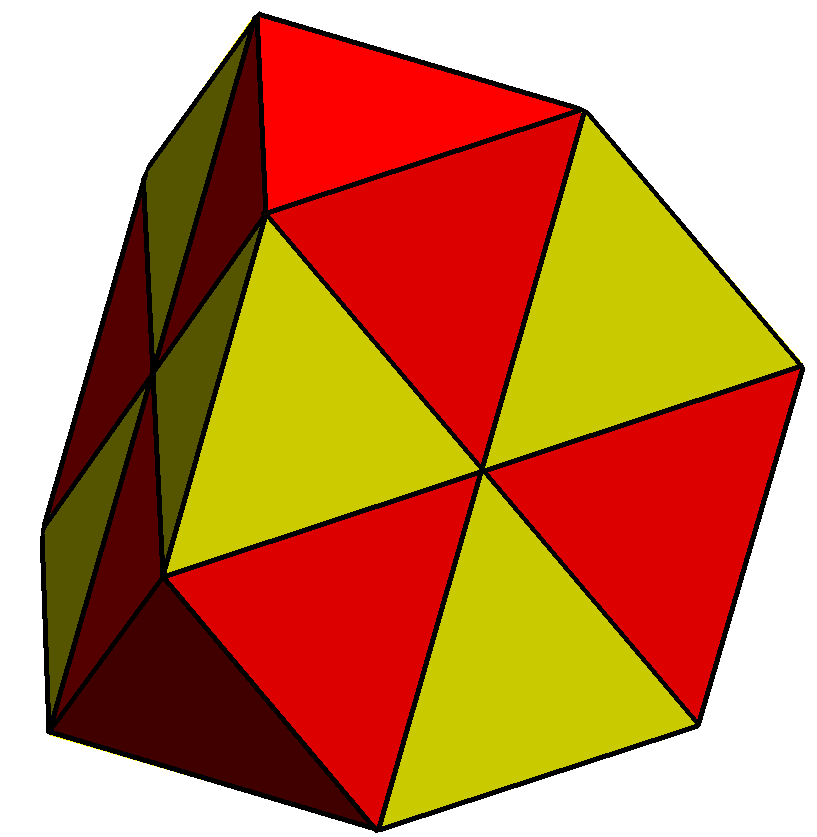
Truncated tetrahedron

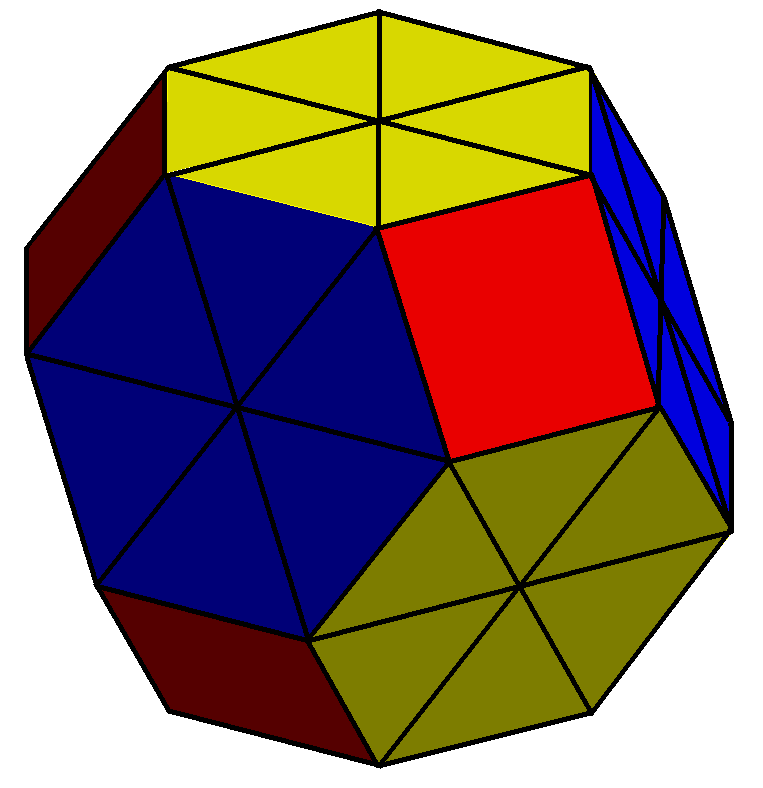
Truncated octahedron

4.4.4.4

Square icositetrahedron
(Cube)

3.4.6.4:

Hexagonal cupola
(Degenerate)

== See also ==
- Geodesic polyhedron
- Goldberg polyhedron
- Johnson solid
- Platonic solid
- Semiregular polyhedron
  - Archimedean solid
  - Prism
  - Antiprism
