= Tetrix =

Tetrix may refer to:

- Tetrix (band), a Canadian rock/improv band
- Tetrix (insect), a genus of insects in the family Tetrigidae called ground-hoppers
- Tetrix Robotics Kit, an educational robotics kit
- 8598 Tetrix, a main-belt asteroid
- A three-dimensional analog of the Sierpiński triangle
