= Dual polyhedron =

Polyhedron associated with another by swapping vertices for faces

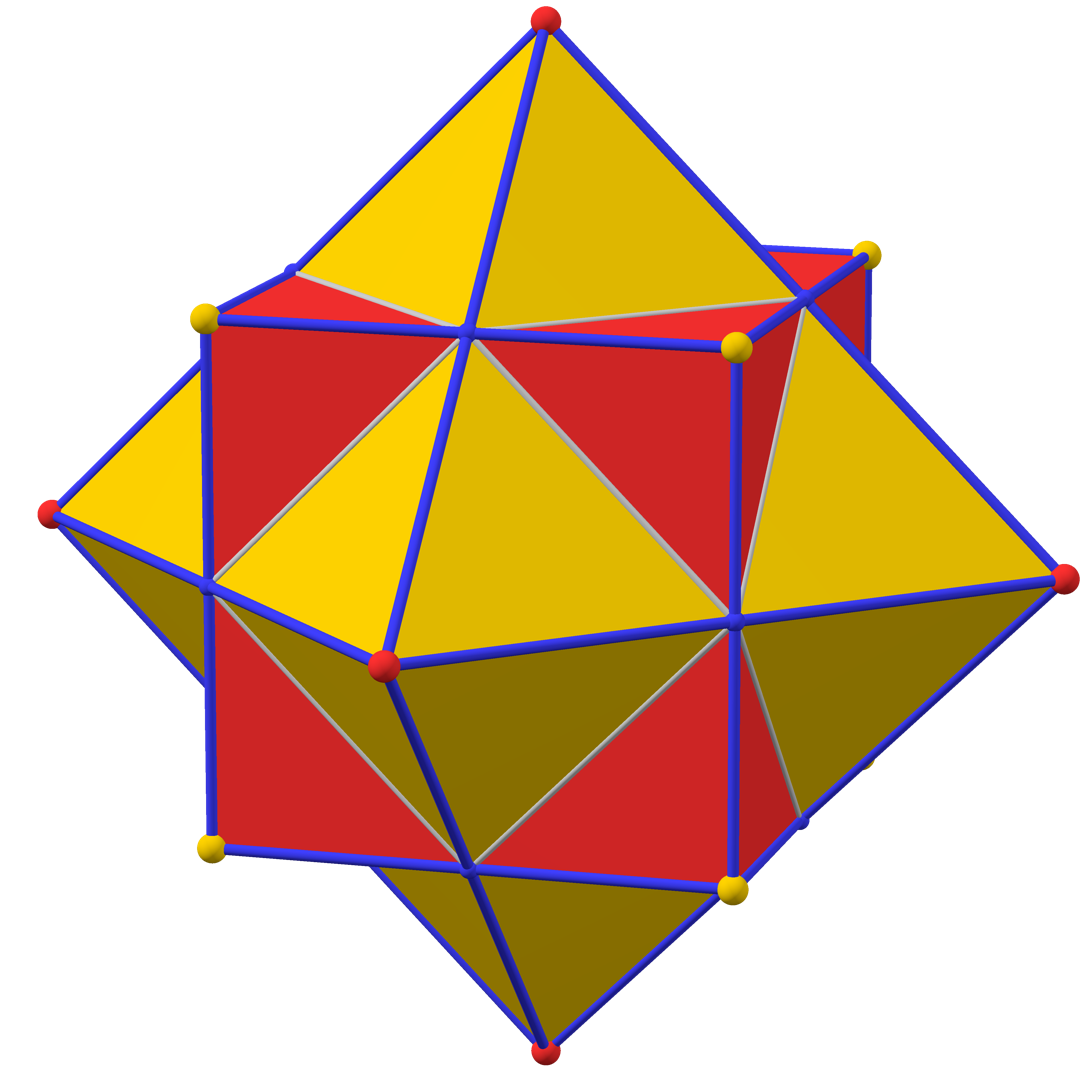
The dual of a cube is an octahedron. Vertices of one correspond to faces of the other, and edges correspond to each other.

In geometry, every polyhedron is associated with a second dual structure, wherein the vertices of one correspond to the faces of the other and the edges between pairs of vertices of one correspond to the edges between pairs of faces of the other. Such dual figures remain combinatorial or abstract polyhedra, but not all can also be constructed as geometric polyhedra. Starting with any given polyhedron, the dual of its dual is the original polyhedron.

Duality preserves the symmetries of a polyhedron. Therefore, for many classes of polyhedra defined by their symmetries, the duals belong to a corresponding symmetry class. For example, the regular polyhedra – the (convex) Platonic solids and (star) Kepler–Poinsot polyhedra – form dual pairs, where the regular tetrahedron is self-dual. The dual of an isogonal polyhedron (one in which any two vertices are equivalent under symmetries of the polyhedron) is an isohedral polyhedron (one in which any two faces are equivalent [...]), and vice versa. The dual of an isotoxal polyhedron (one in which any two edges are equivalent [...]) is also isotoxal.

Duality is closely related to polar reciprocity, a geometric transformation that, when applied to a convex polyhedron, realizes the dual polyhedron as another convex polyhedron.

== Kinds of duality ==
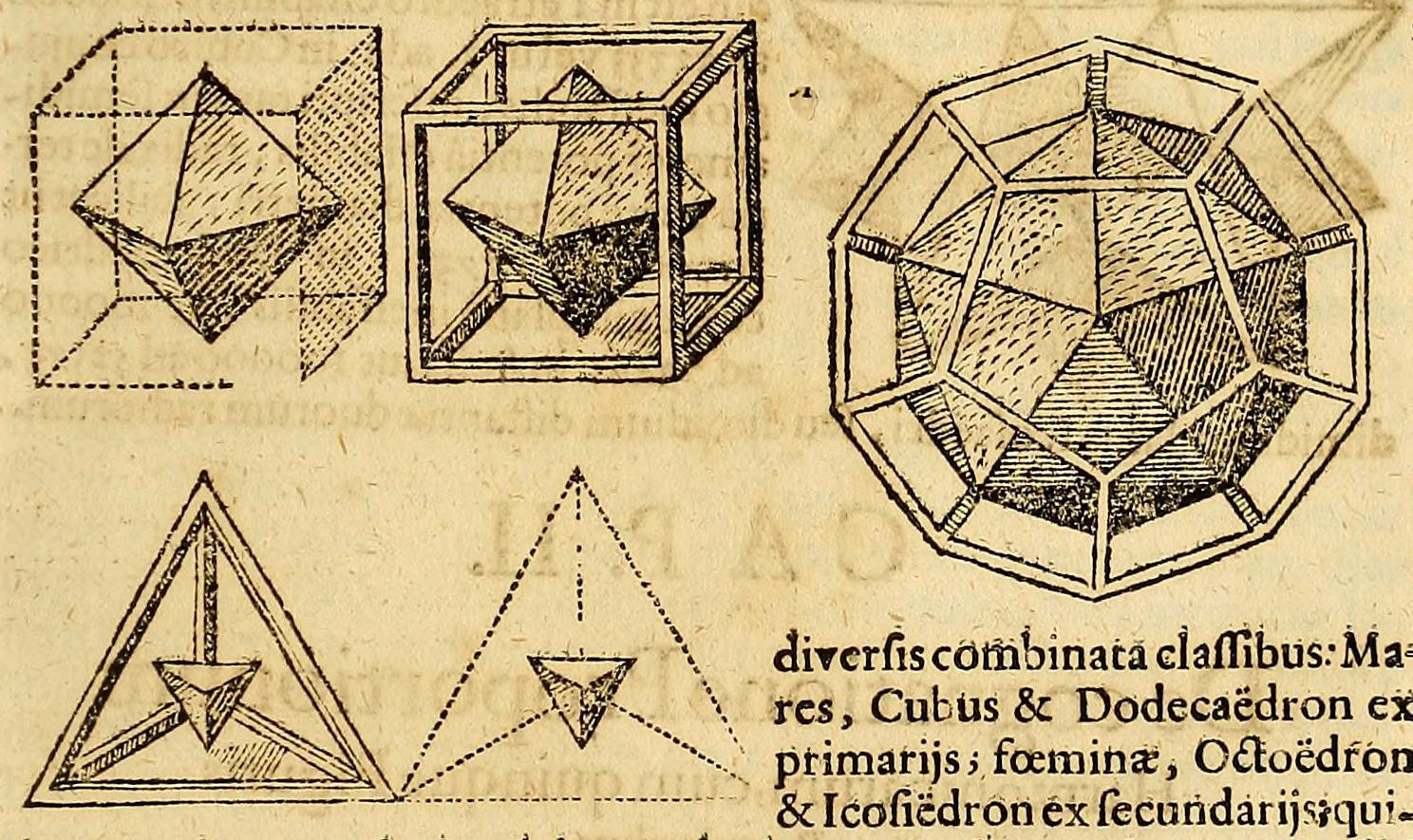
The dual of a Platonic solid can be constructed by connecting the face centers. In general this creates only a topological dual. Images from Kepler's Harmonice Mundi (1619)

There are many kinds of duality. The kinds most relevant to elementary polyhedra are polar reciprocity and topological or abstract duality.

=== Polar reciprocation ===
In Euclidean space, the dual of a polyhedron $P$ is often defined in terms of polar reciprocation about a sphere. Here, each vertex (pole) is associated with a face plane (polar plane or just polar) so that the ray from the center to the vertex is perpendicular to the plane, and the product of the distances from the center to each is equal to the square of the radius.

When the sphere has radius $r$ and is centered at the origin (so that it is defined by the equation $x^2 + y^2 + z^2 = r^2$), then the polar dual of a convex polyhedron $P$ is defined as

$P^\circ = \{ q~\big|~q \cdot p \leq r^2$ for all $p$ in $P \} ,$

where $q \cdot p$ denotes the standard dot product of $q$ and $p$.

Typically when no sphere is specified in the construction of the dual, then the unit sphere is used, meaning $r=1$ in the above definitions.

For each face plane of $P$ described by the linear equation
$$x_0x + y_0y + z_0z = r^2,$$
the corresponding vertex of the dual polyhedron $P^\circ$ will have coordinates $(x_0,y_0,z_0)$. Similarly, each vertex of $P$ corresponds to a face plane of $P^\circ$, and each edge line of $P$ corresponds to an edge line of $P^\circ$. The correspondence between the vertices, edges, and faces of $P$ and $P^\circ$ reverses inclusion. For example, if an edge of $P$ contains a vertex, the corresponding edge of $P^\circ$ will be contained in the corresponding face.

For a polyhedron with a center of symmetry, it is common to use a sphere centered on this point, as in the Dorman Luke construction (mentioned below). Failing that, for a polyhedron with a circumscribed sphere, inscribed sphere, or midsphere (one with all edges as tangents), this can be used. However, it is possible to reciprocate a polyhedron about any sphere, and the resulting form of the dual will depend on the size and position of the sphere; as the sphere is varied, so too is the dual form. The choice of center for the sphere is sufficient to define the dual up to similarity.

If a polyhedron in Euclidean space has a face plane, edge line, or vertex lying on the center of the sphere, the corresponding element of its dual will go to infinity. Since Euclidean space never reaches infinity, the projective equivalent, called extended Euclidean space, may be formed by adding the required 'plane at infinity'. Some theorists prefer to stick to Euclidean space and say that there is no dual. Meanwhile, Wenninger (1983) found a way to represent these infinite duals, in a manner suitable for making models (of some finite portion).

The concept of duality here is closely related to the duality in projective geometry, where lines and edges are interchanged. Projective polarity works well enough for convex polyhedra. But for non-convex figures such as star polyhedra, when we seek to rigorously define this form of polyhedral duality in terms of projective polarity, various problems appear. Because of the definitional issues for geometric duality of non-convex polyhedra, Grünbaum (2007) argues that any proper definition of a non-convex polyhedron should include a notion of a dual polyhedron.

==== Canonical duals ====
Any convex polyhedron can be distorted into a canonical form, in which a unit midsphere (or intersphere) exists tangent to every edge, and such that the average position of the points of tangency is the center of the sphere. This form is unique up to congruences.

If we reciprocate such a canonical polyhedron about its midsphere, the dual polyhedron will share the same edge-tangency points, and thus will also be canonical. It is the canonical dual, and the two together form a canonical dual compound.

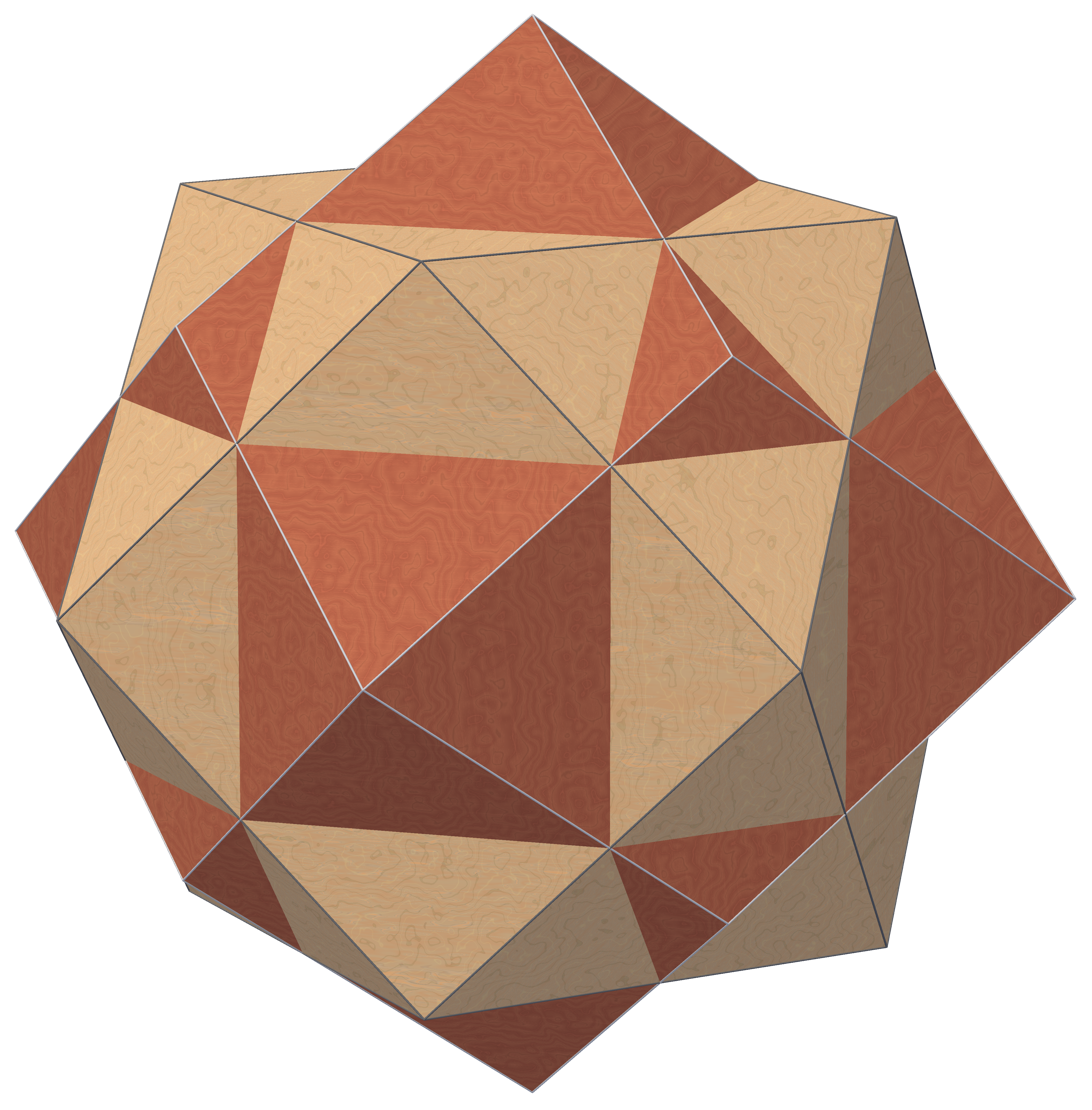
Canonical dual compound of cuboctahedron (light) and rhombic dodecahedron (dark). Pairs of edges meet on their common midsphere.

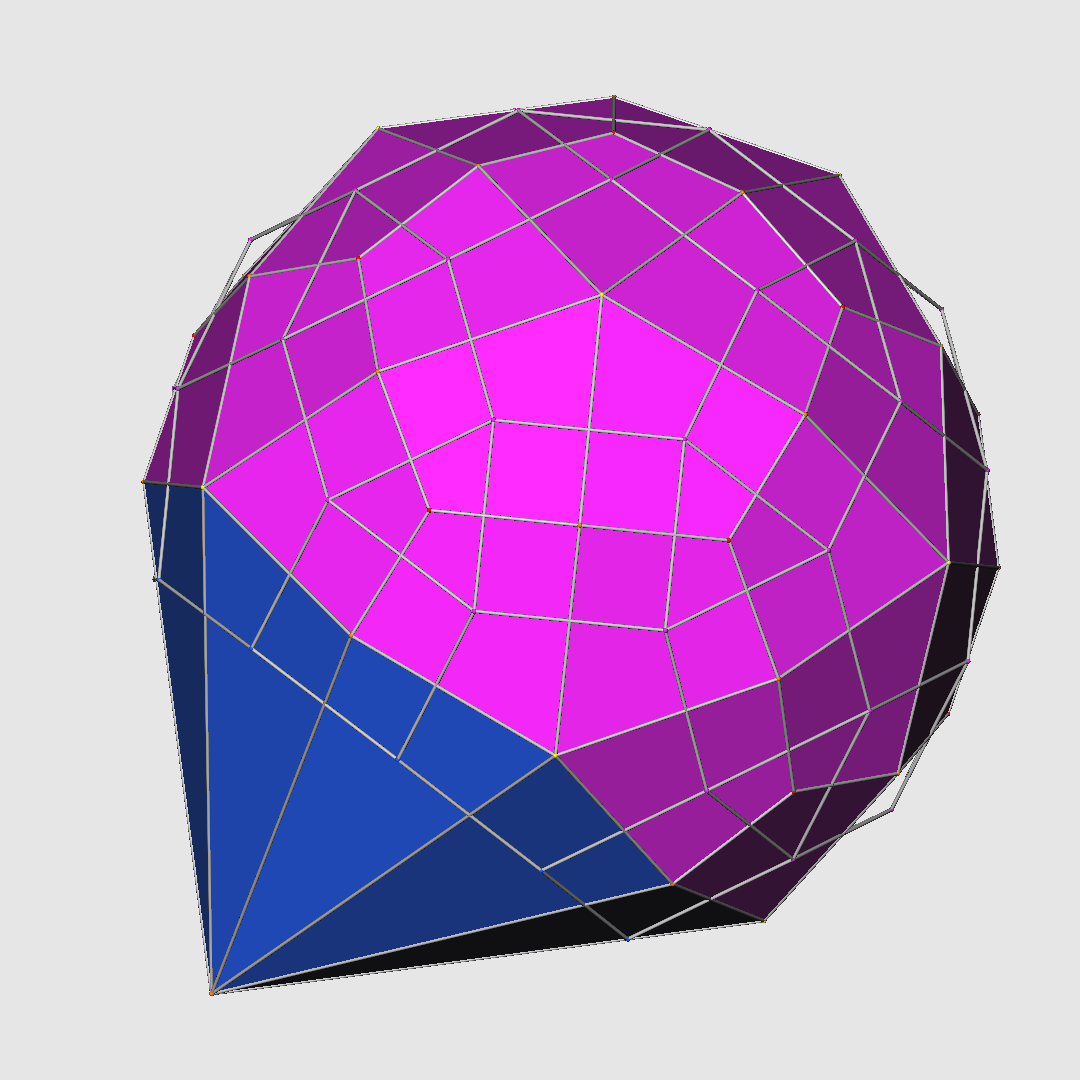
Dual of the diminished rhombicosidodecahedron with original lattice, both on common midsphere.

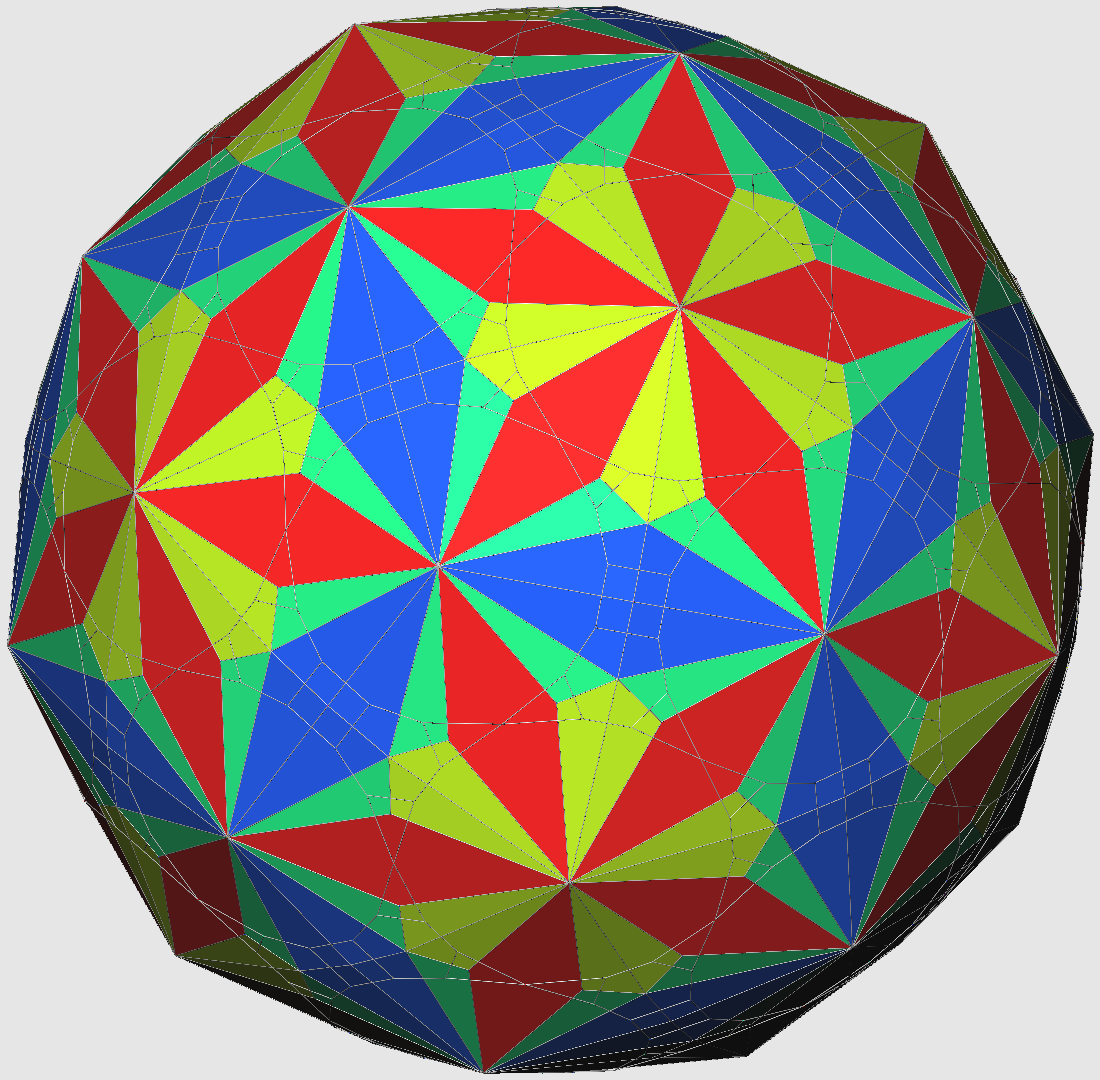
Dual of the symmetrohedron i,3,5,*,v with original lattice.

Self-dual compound of two rhombic prisms. Solid found in Near-miss Johnson solid and Midsphere.

Self-dual tridecahedron.

A canonical dual compound of two polyhedra with pyritohedral symmetry.

Canonical dual compound derived from the chiral tetrated dodecahedron.

==== Dorman Luke construction ====
For a uniform polyhedron, each face of the dual polyhedron may be derived from the original polyhedron's corresponding vertex figure by using the Dorman Luke construction.

=== Topological duality ===
Even when a pair of polyhedra cannot be obtained by reciprocation from each other, they may be called duals of each other as long as the vertices of one correspond to the faces of the other, and the edges of one correspond to the edges of the other, in an incidence-preserving way. Such pairs of polyhedra are still topologically or abstractly dual.

The vertices and edges of a convex polyhedron form a graph (the 1-skeleton of the polyhedron), embedded on the surface of the polyhedron (a topological sphere). This graph can be projected to form a Schlegel diagram on a flat plane. The graph formed by the vertices and edges of the dual polyhedron is the dual graph of the original graph.

More generally, for any polyhedron whose faces form a closed surface, the vertices and edges of the polyhedron form a graph embedded on this surface, and the vertices and edges of the (abstract) dual polyhedron form the dual graph of the original graph.

An abstract polyhedron is a certain kind of partially ordered set (poset) of elements, such that incidences, or connections, between elements of the set correspond to incidences between elements (faces, edges, vertices) of a polyhedron. Every such poset has a dual poset, formed by reversing all of the order relations. If the poset is visualized as a Hasse diagram, the dual poset can be visualized simply by turning the Hasse diagram upside down.

Every geometric polyhedron corresponds to an abstract polyhedron in this way, and has an abstract dual polyhedron. However, for some types of non-convex geometric polyhedra, the dual polyhedra may not be realizable geometrically.

== Self-dual polyhedra ==
Topologically, a polyhedron is said to be self-dual if its dual has exactly the same connectivity between vertices, edges, and faces. Abstractly, they have the same Hasse diagram. Geometrically, it is not only topologically self-dual, but its polar reciprocal about a certain point, typically its centroid, is a similar figure. For example, the dual of a regular tetrahedron is another regular tetrahedron, reflected through the origin.

Every polygon is topologically self-dual, since it has the same number of vertices as edges, and these are switched by duality. But it is not necessarily self-dual (up to rigid motion, for instance). Every polygon has a regular form which is geometrically self-dual about its intersphere: all angles are congruent, as are all edges, so under duality these congruences swap. Similarly, every topologically self-dual convex polyhedron can be realized by an equivalent geometrically self-dual polyhedron, its canonical polyhedron, reciprocal about the center of the midsphere.

There are infinitely many geometrically self-dual polyhedra. The simplest infinite family is the pyramids. Another infinite family, elongated pyramids, consists of polyhedra that can be roughly described as a pyramid sitting on top of a prism (with the same number of sides). Adding a frustum (pyramid with the top cut off) below the prism generates another infinite family, and so on. There are many other convex self-dual polyhedra. For example, there are 6 different ones with 7 vertices and 16 with 8 vertices.

A self-dual non-convex icosahedron with hexagonal faces was identified by Brückner in 1900. Other non-convex self-dual polyhedra have been found, under certain definitions of non-convex polyhedra and their duals.

One way of describing the self-duality of a polyhedron is through a permutation of the set of vertices and faces that maps every vertex to a face and every face to a vertex, preserving vertex-face incidences. The inverse of a self-duality permutation is another such permutation, and it is natural to expect a self-duality permutation to be an involution (a self-inverse permutation), but there exist self-dual convex polyhedra for which all self-duality permutations are not involutions. An example published by Stanislav Jendroľ in 1989 has 14 vertices and 14 faces.

== Dual polytopes and tessellations ==
Duality can be generalized to n-dimensional space and dual polytopes; in two dimensions these are called dual polygons.

The vertices of one polytope correspond to the $(n-1)$-dimensional elements, or facets, of the other, and the $j$ points that define a $(j-1)$-dimensional element will correspond to $j$ hyperplanes that intersect to give a $(n-j)$-dimensional element. The dual of an $n$-dimensional tessellation or honeycomb can be defined similarly.

In general, the facets of a polytope's dual will be the topological duals of the polytope's vertex figures. For the polar reciprocals of the regular and uniform polytopes, the dual facets will be polar reciprocals of the original's vertex figure. For example, in four dimensions, the vertex figure of the 600-cell is the icosahedron; the dual of the 600-cell is the 120-cell, whose facets are dodecahedra, which are the dual of the icosahedron.

=== Self-dual polytopes and tessellations ===
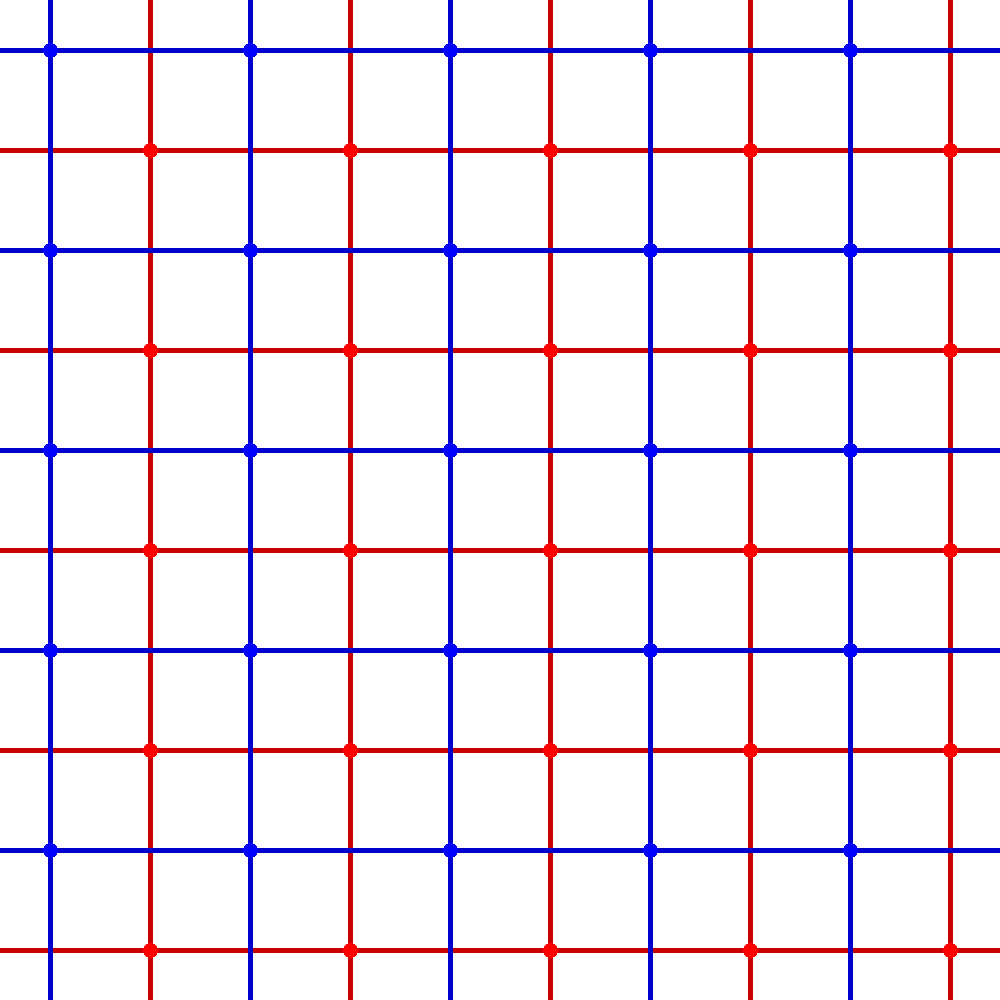
The square tiling, {4,4}, is self-dual, as shown by these red and blue tilings

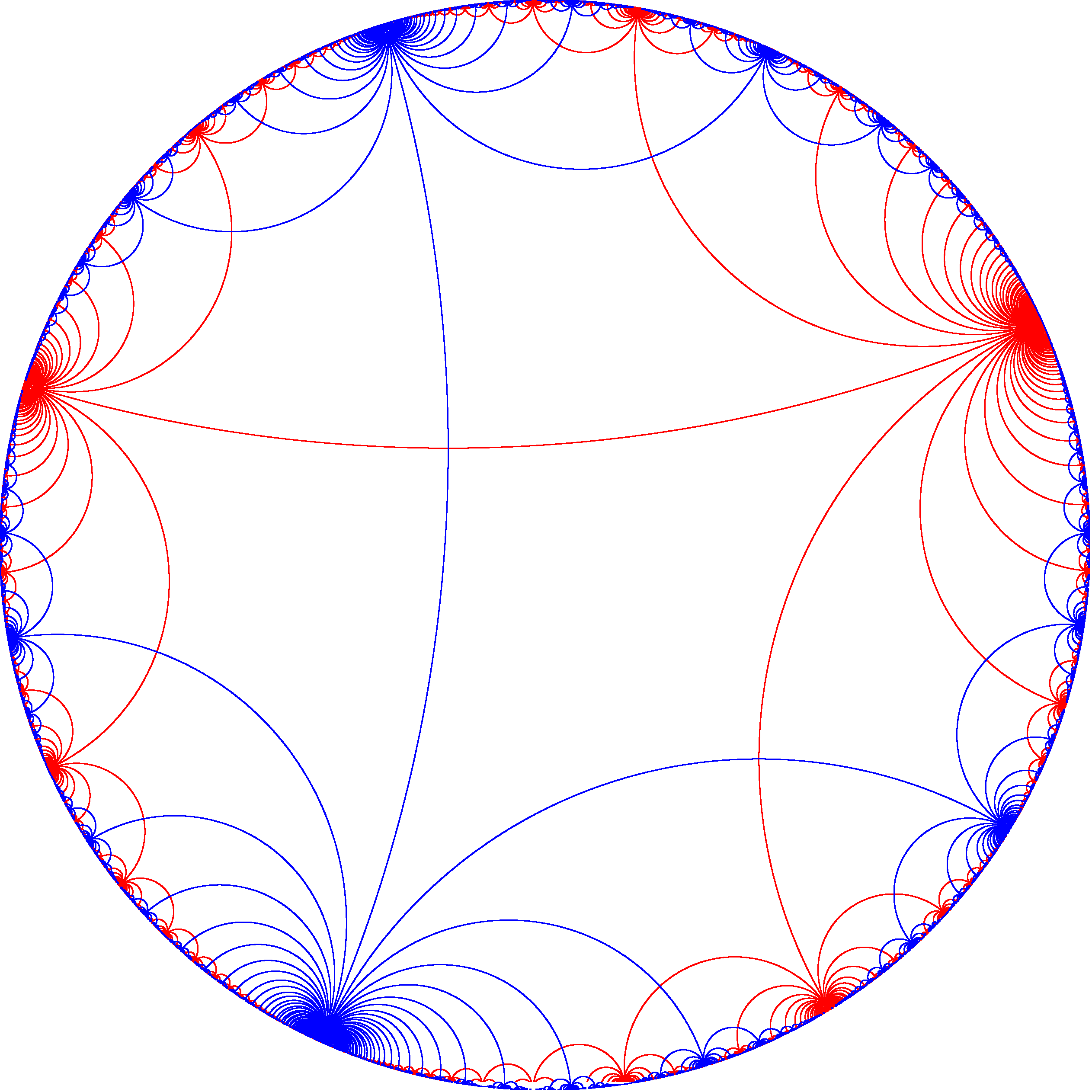
The Infinite-order apeirogonal tiling, {∞,∞} in red, and its dual position in blue

The primary class of self-dual polytopes are regular polytopes with palindromic Schläfli symbols. All regular polygons, {a} are self-dual, polyhedra of the form {a,a}, 4-polytopes of the form {a,b,a}, 5-polytopes of the form {a,b,b,a}, etc.

The self-dual regular polytopes are:

- All regular polygons, {a}.
- Regular tetrahedron: {3,3}
- In general, all regular n-simplexes, {3,3,...,3}
- The regular 24-cell in 4 dimensions, {3,4,3}.
- The great 120-cell {5,5/2,5} and the grand stellated 120-cell {5/2,5,5/2}

The self-dual (infinite) regular Euclidean honeycombs are:

- Apeirogon: {∞}
- Square tiling: {4,4}
- Cubic honeycomb: {4,3,4}
- In general, all regular n-dimensional Euclidean hypercubic honeycombs: {4,3,...,3,4}.

The self-dual (infinite) regular hyperbolic honeycombs are:

- Compact hyperbolic tilings: {5,5}, {6,6}, ... {p,p}.
- Paracompact hyperbolic tiling: {∞,∞}
- Compact hyperbolic honeycombs: {3,5,3}, {5,3,5}, and {5,3,3,5}
- Paracompact hyperbolic honeycombs: {3,6,3}, {6,3,6}, {4,4,4}, and {3,3,4,3,3}

== See also ==
- Conway polyhedron notation
- Dual polygon
- Self-dual graph
- Self-dual polygon
