= James Friauf =

American electrical engineer

James Byron Friauf (1896 – 1972) was an American electrical engineer who first determined the crystal structure of MgZn_{2} in 1927. Friauf was a professor of physics at the Carnegie Institute of Technology, now Carnegie Mellon University. He had received training in the determination of the structure of crystals as a student at California Institute of Technology where he studied with Roscoe Gilkey Dickinson.

The structure Friauf discovered consists of intra-penetrating icosahedra, which coordinate the Zn atoms, and 16-vertex polyhedra that coordinate the Mg atoms. The latter type of polyhedron is called a Friauf polyhedron and is, actually, an inter-penetrating tetrahedron and a 12-vertex truncated polyhedron. MgZn_{2} is a member of the largest class of single intermetallic structures, since referred to as the Laves phases, the Friauf phases, or the Laves–Friauf phases.

== Publications ==
- Friauf, James B. (18 March 2009). "Electromagnetic Ship Propulsion". Journal of the American Society for Naval Engineers. 73 (1): 139–142. doi:10.1111/j.1559-3584.1961.tb02428.x.
- Friauf, James B. (1 September 1925). "The Design of a Cam for an X-Ray Spectrograph". Journal of the Optical Society of America. 11 (3): 289. Bibcode:1925JOSA...11..289F. doi:10.1364/JOSA.11.000289.
- Friauf, James B. (1 January 1927). "The Crystal Structure of Magnesium Di-Zincide". Physical Review. 29 (1): 34–40. Bibcode:1927PhRv...29...34F. doi:10.1103/PhysRev.29.34.
- Friauf, James B. (December 1927). "The Crystal Structures of Two Intermetallic Compounds". Journal of the American Chemical Society. 49 (12): 3107–3114. Bibcode:1927JAChS..49.3107F. doi:10.1021/ja01411a017.
