= Truncated triakis icosahedron =

Truncated triakis icosahedron
Truncated triakis icosahedron
Conway notation	t10kI = dk10tD
Faces	12 decagons 60 pentagons
Edges	210
Vertices	140
Dual	Decakis truncated dodecahedron
Vertex configuration	12 (5.5.5); 60 (5.5.10)
Symmetry group	I_{h}
Properties	convex
Net

The truncated triakis icosahedron, or more precisely an order-10 truncated triakis icosahedron, is a convex polyhedron with 72 faces: 20 sets of 3 pentagons arranged in an icosahedral arrangement, with 12 decagons in the gaps.

== Triakis icosahedron ==
It is constructed from a triakis icosahedron by truncating the order-10 vertices. This creates 12 regular decagon faces, and leaves 60 mirror-symmetric pentagons.

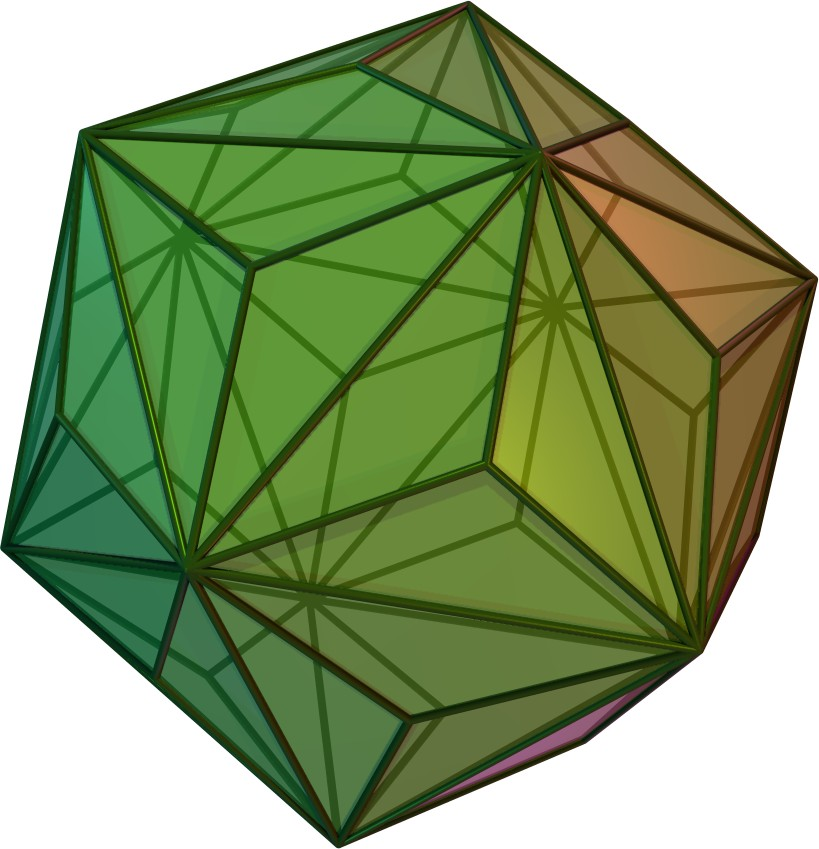
Triakis icosahedron

== Decakis truncated dodecahedron ==
The dual of the truncated triakis icosahedron is called a decakis truncated dodecahedron. It can be seen as a truncated dodecahedron with decagonal pyramids augmented to the faces.

Truncated dodecahedron	Decakis truncated dodecahedron	Net

== See also ==
- Truncated triakis tetrahedron
- Truncated triakis octahedron
- Truncated tetrakis cube
