= Truncated triakis octahedron =

Truncated triakis octahedron
Truncated triakis octahedron
Conway notation	t8kO = dk8tC
Faces	6 octagons 24 pentagons
Edges	84
Vertices	56
Dual	Octakis truncated cube
Vertex configuration	8 (5.5.5); 48 (5.5.8)
Symmetry group	O_{h}
Properties	convex
Net

The truncated triakis octahedron, or more precisely an order-8 truncated triakis octahedron, is a convex polyhedron with 30 faces: 8 sets of 3 pentagons arranged in an octahedral arrangement, with 6 octagons in the gaps.

== Triakis octahedron ==
It is constructed from a triakis octahedron by truncating the order-8 vertices. This creates 6 regular octagon faces, and leaves 24 mirror-symmetric pentagons.

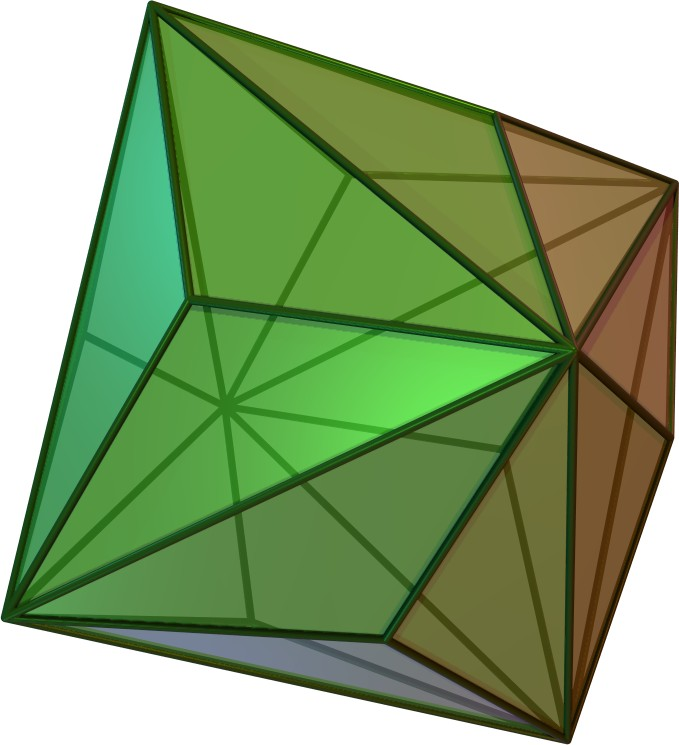
Triakis octahedron

== Octakis truncated cube ==
The dual of the order-8 truncated triakis octahedron is called a octakis truncated cube. It can be seen as a truncated cube with octagonal pyramids augmented to the faces.

Truncated cube	Octakis truncated cube	Net

=== Uses ===
The DaYan Gem 6 is a twisty puzzle in this shape.

== See also ==
- Truncated triakis tetrahedron
- Truncated tetrakis cube
- Truncated triakis icosahedron
