= Tetrix (band) =

Canadian rock/improv band

Background information
- Origin: Calgary, Alberta, Canada
- Genres: Psychedelic rock/Improvised music
- Years active: 2001–present
- Labels: MeWe Le Disque, Odin Audio
- Members: Pockett; Krock; Conman

Tetrix (often stylized as TETRIX) is a Canadian psychedelic rock/improvised music band formed in Calgary. The band was formed in 2001 with the intention of exploring connections between jazz, psychedelic rock, hip hop, punk rock, folk and electronic music.

The name Tetrix is derived from the popular computer game Tetris and the fractal Sierpinski triangle. Themes of freedom (philosophy), mathematics and mysticism appear throughout the band's music.

The band has released 17 full-length albums on Calgary's Odin Audio label and a 12" compilation LP on Belgium's MeWe Le Disque Label. Tetrix has been featured in numerous publications including Fast Forward Weekly, Beatroute and Gauntlet in Canada, Trax magazine in France and Voxer magazine across Europe. Tetrix has also been a strong supporter of local independent radio, and has appeared live on Calgary's CJSW 5 times in support of their funding drive.

== Band members ==
=== Current ===
- Pockett
- Krock
- Conman

== Discography ==
=== Full-length albums ===
- Tetrix 1 (2002)
- Tetrix 2 (2002)
- Tetrix 3 (2003)
- Tetrix 4 (2003)
- Tetrix 5 (2004)
- Tetrix 6 (2005)
- Tetrix 7 (2006)
- Tetrix 8 (2007)
- Tetrix 9 (2008)
- Tetrix 10 (2009)
- Tetrix 11 (2011)
- Tetrix 12 (2012)
- Tetrix 13 (2014)
- Tetrix 14 (2016)
- Cassette Romance (2017)
- Drugs in the Water (2018)
- Every House Has a Light On (2019)

=== Compilation 12" LPs ===
- Tetrix (2005)
