= Tetrakis (Paphlagonia) =

Town in ancient Paphlagonia

Tetrakis (Ancient Greek: Τετράκις) was a Greek town of ancient Paphlagonia on the Black Sea coast. Its site is unlocated but based on the position it occupies in the text of the Periplus of Pseudo-Scylax, it would be west of Sinope.

Its site is unlocated.
