= Truncated tetrakis cube =

Geometric object

Truncated tetrakis cube Hexatruncated tetrakis cube
Truncated tetrakis cube
Conway notation	t6kC = dk6tO
Faces	8 hexagons 24 pentagons
Edges	84
Vertices	54
Dual	Hexakis truncated octahedron
Vertex configuration	6 (5.5.5.5); 48 (5.5.6)
Symmetry group	O_{h}
Properties	convex

The truncated tetrakis cube, or more precisely an order-6 truncated tetrakis cube or hexatruncated tetrakis cube, is a convex polyhedron with 32 faces: 24 sets of 3 bilateral symmetry pentagons arranged in an octahedral arrangement, with 8 regular hexagons in the gaps.

== Construction ==
It is constructed from a tetrakis cube by truncating the order-6 vertices. This creates 4 regular hexagon faces, and leaves 12 mirror-symmetric pentagons.

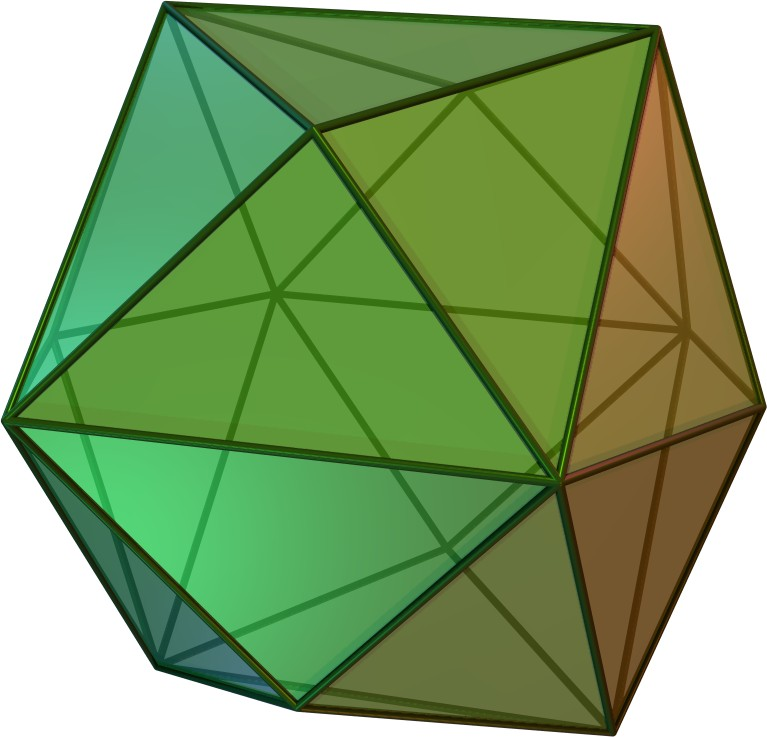
tetrakis cube

== Hexakis truncated octahedron ==
The dual of the order-6 truncated triakis tetrahedron is called a hexakis truncated octahedron. It is constructed by a truncated octahedron with hexagonal pyramids augmented.

Truncated octahedron	hexakis truncated octahedron

== See also ==
- Truncated triakis tetrahedron
- Truncated triakis octahedron
- Truncated triakis icosahedron
