= Triakis truncated tetrahedral honeycomb =

Space-filling tessellation

Triakis truncated tetrahedral honeycomb
Cell type	Triakis truncated tetrahedron
Face types	hexagon isosceles triangle
Coxeter group	Ã_{3}×2, [[3^{[4]}]] (double)
Space group	Fd3̅m (227)
Properties	Cell-transitive

The triakis truncated tetrahedral honeycomb is a space-filling tessellation (or honeycomb) in Euclidean 3-space made up of triakis truncated tetrahedra. It was discovered in 1914.

== Voronoi tessellation ==
It is the Voronoi tessellation of the carbon atoms in diamond, which lie in the diamond cubic crystal structure.

Being composed entirely of triakis truncated tetrahedra, it is cell-transitive.

== Relation to quarter cubic honeycomb ==
It can be seen as the uniform quarter cubic honeycomb where its tetrahedral cells are subdivided by the center point into 4 shorter tetrahedra, and each adjoined to the adjacent truncated tetrahedral cells.

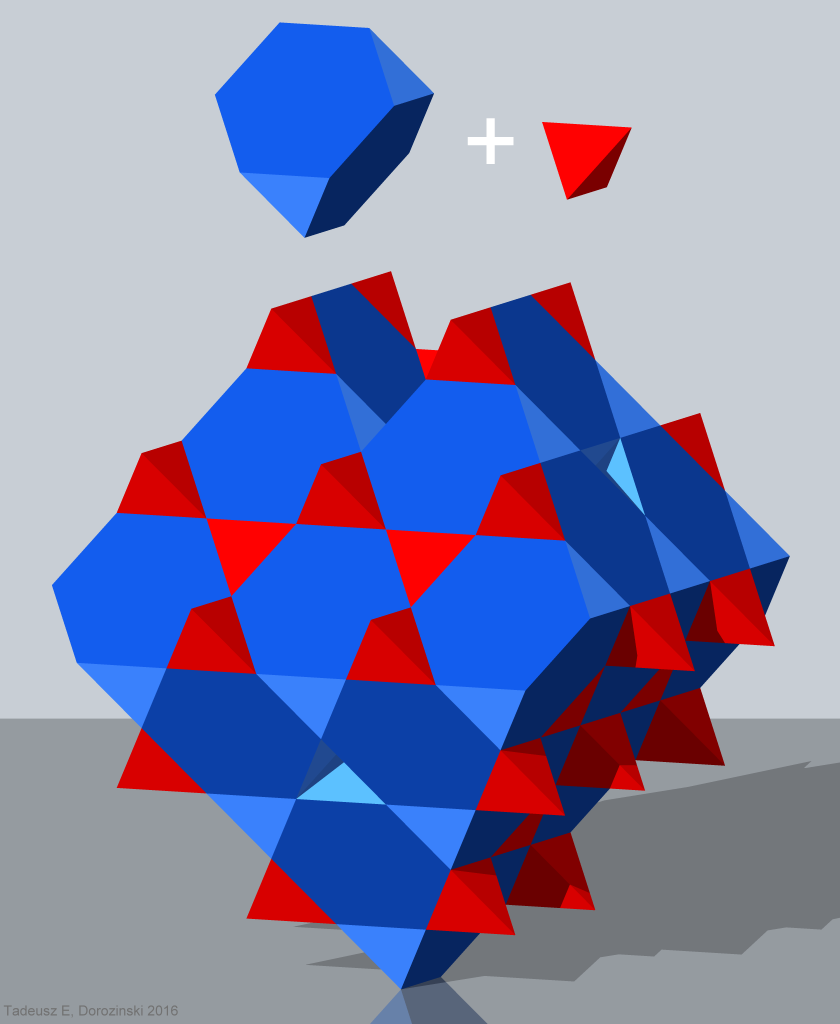

== See also ==
- Disphenoid tetrahedral honeycomb
