= Tetricus =

Tetricus may refer to:

- Tetricus I, emperor of the Gallic Empire, reigning from 270/271 to 273
- Tetricus II, son of Tetricus I, co-ruler, reigning from 271 to 274
- Tetricus of Langres (died 572/73), Bishop of Langres
