= Truncated triakis tetrahedron =

Near-miss Johnson solid with 16 faces

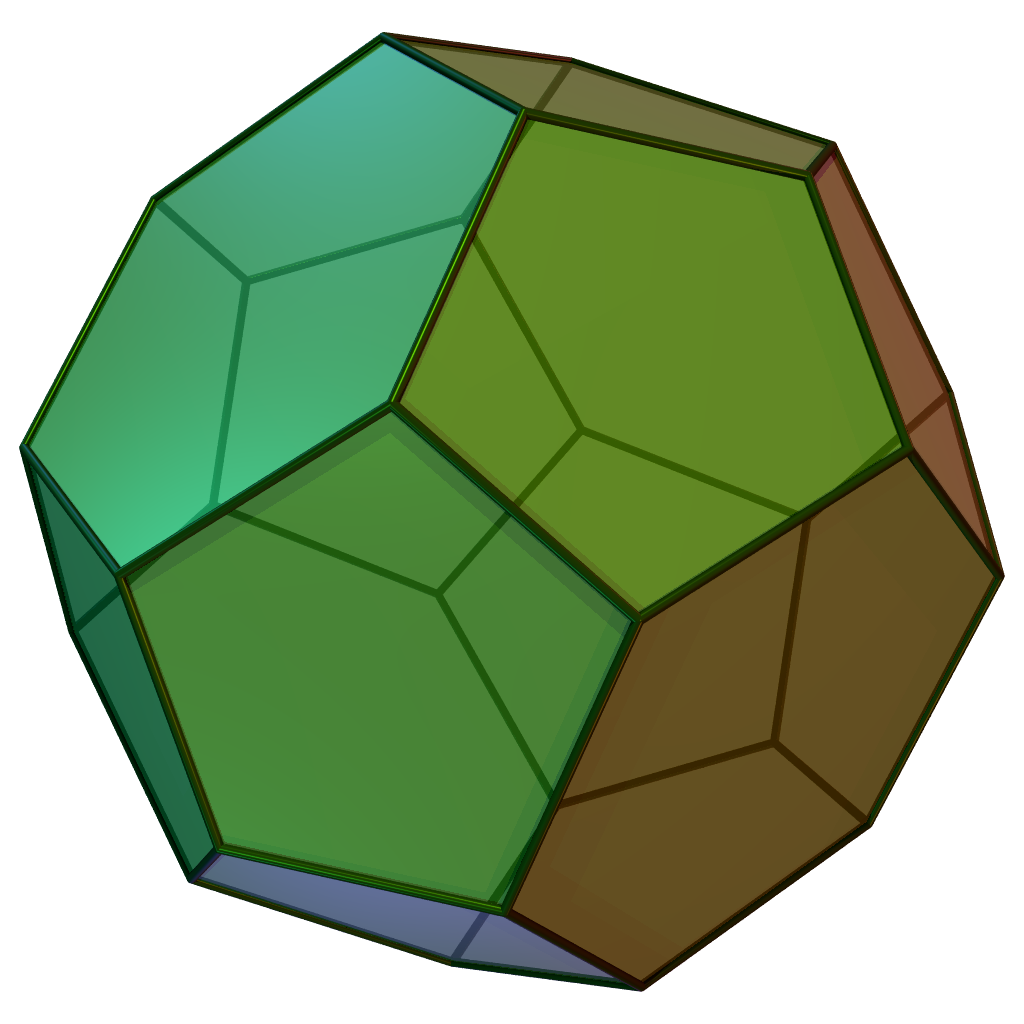
- Type: Fullerene, Near-miss Johnson solid
- Faces: 4 hexagons 12 irregular pentagons
- Edges: 42
- Vertices: 28
- Symmetry group: tetrahedral symmetry T_{d}
- Properties: convex

Net
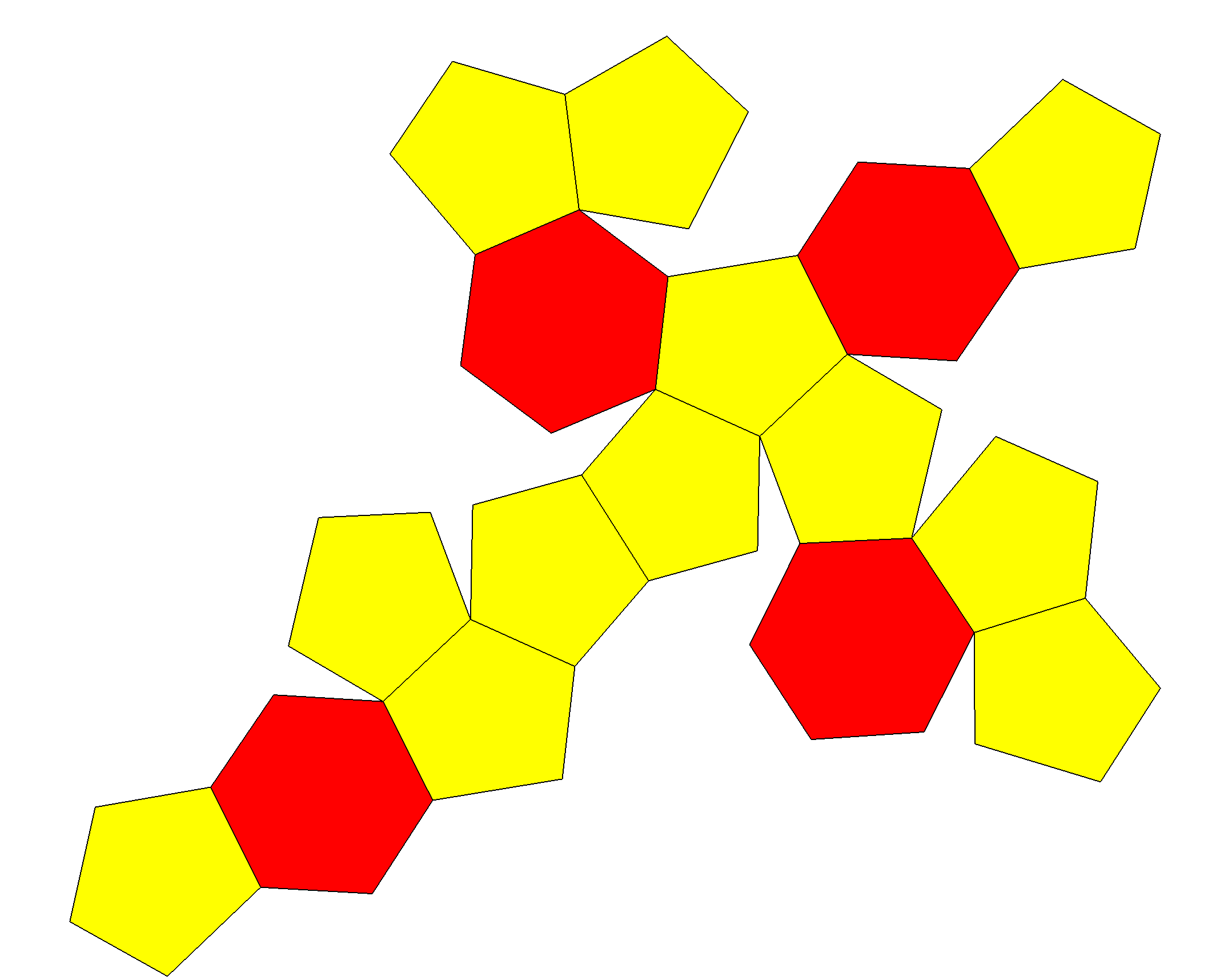

A truncated triakis tetrahedron

3D model of a truncated triakis tetrahedron

In geometry, the truncated triakis tetrahedron is a convex polyhedron with 16 faces: four sets of three pentagons with a shared vertex, arranged in a tetrahedral arrangement, with four hexagons in the remaining gaps. The faces cannot all be regular polygons, so it is a near-miss Johnson solid. As a fullerene, it is called tetrahedral fullerene or C_{28} fullerene, and has been suggested as the smallest stable carbon fullerene.

== Chemistry ==
This structure is a fullerene, one of two 28-vertex fullerenes. In this context, it is called tetrahedral fullerene or C_{28} fullerene. It has been suggested that, as an allotrope of carbon (C_{28}), it may form the smallest stable fullerene, and experiments have found it to be stabilized by encapsulating a metal atom. Its tetrahedral symmetry and its four irregular vertices where three pentagons meet make it tetravalent, likely either to form tetravalent clusters of fullerenes or to encapsulate tetravalent atoms such as uranium.

== Geometry ==
This polyhedron is one of the polyhedra studied in 1935 by Michael Goldberg as a possible solution to the isoperimetric problem of maximizing the volume for a given number of faces (16 in this case) and a given surface area. For this optimization problem, the optimal geometric form for the polyhedron is one in which the faces are all tangent to an inscribed sphere. Despite the connection with Goldberg, this polyhedron is not a Goldberg polyhedron, because it has only tetrahedral symmetry rather than the icosahedral symmetry of the Goldberg polyhedra.

The pentagons of this polyhedron cannot be regular pentagons, because if they were then the hexagonal faces would not be flat. As a polyhedron that has near-regular but not regular faces, it is an example of a near-miss Johnson solid, "the closest near miss with higher than prismatic symmetry".

A combinatorially equivalent (but not necessarily geometrically congruent) polyhedron can be constructed from a triakis tetrahedron by truncating the order-6 vertices. The truncated vertices become four hexagon faces, and the obtuse triangles of the triakis tetrahedron are truncated at their acute vertices into pentagons.

== Hexakis Truncated Tetrahedron ==
The dual of the truncated triakis tetrahedron is called a hexakis truncated tetrahedron. It is constructed by augmenting the hexagonal faces of a truncated tetrahedron with pyramids.

Truncated Tetrahedron	Hexakis Truncated Tetrahedron

== See also ==
- Truncated tetrakis cube
- Truncated triakis octahedron
- Truncated triakis icosahedron
- Chamfered dodecahedron
