= Tetrated dodecahedron =

Near-miss Johnson solid with 28 faces

- Type: Near-miss Johnson solid
- Faces: 4 equilateral triangles 12 isosceles triangles 12 pentagons
- Edges: 54
- Vertices: 28
- Vertex configuration: 4 (5.5.5); 12 (3.5.3.5); 12 (3.3.5.5)
- Symmetry group: T_{d}
- Properties: convex

Net
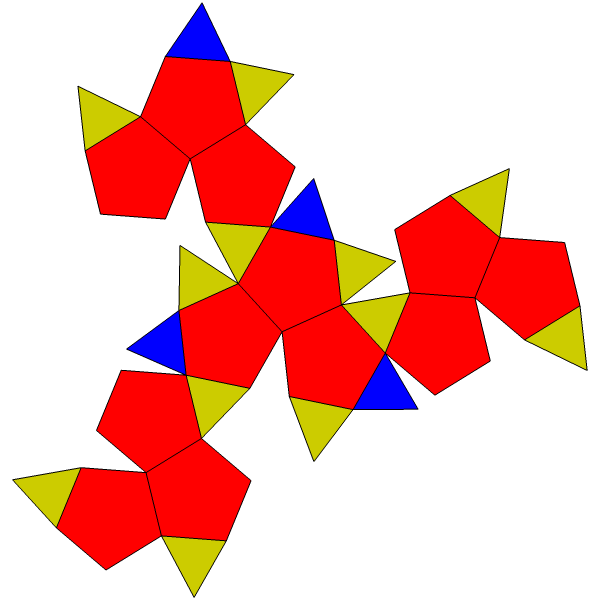

3D model of a tetrated dodecahedron

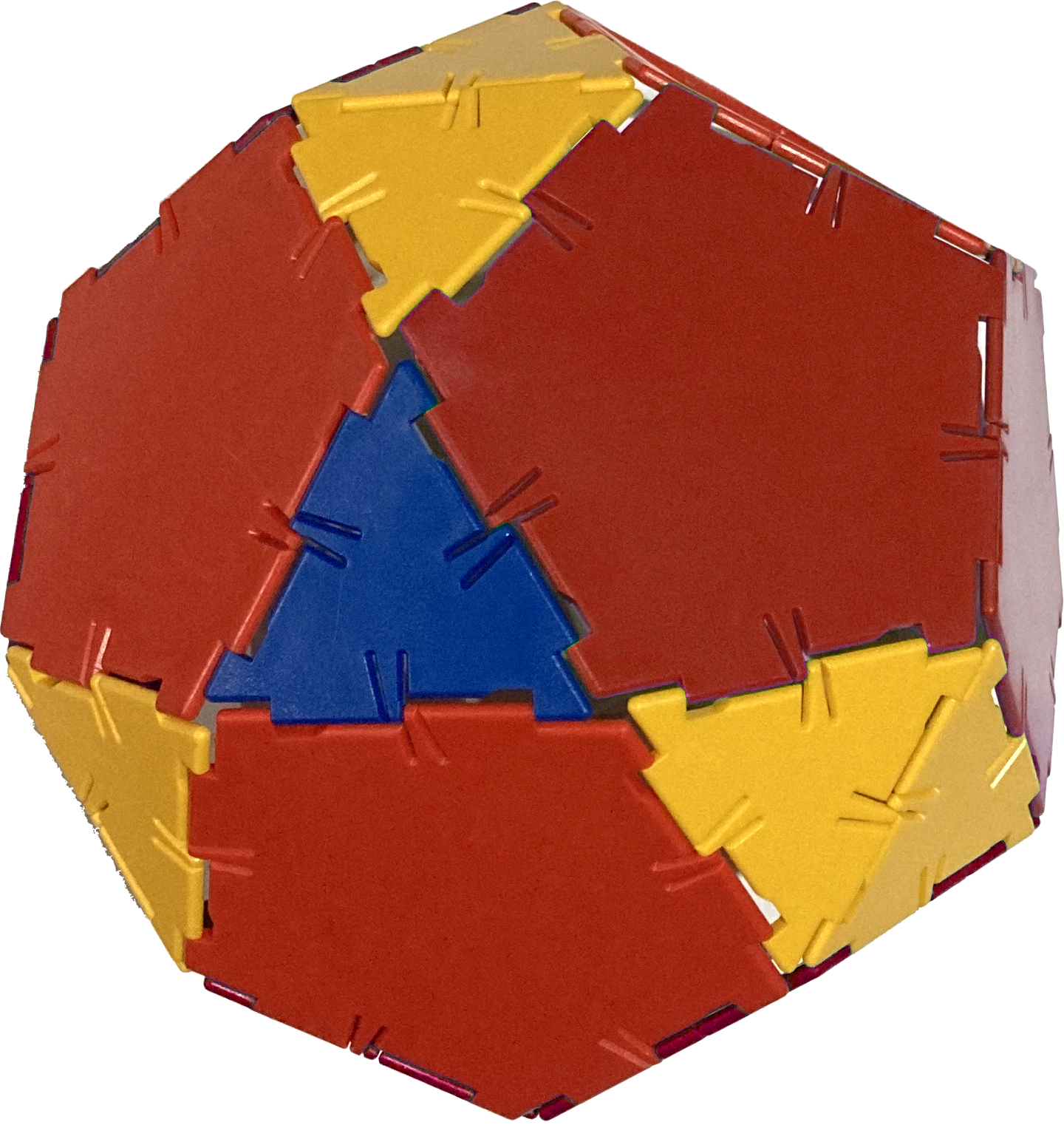
Model built with polydron

In geometry, the tetrated dodecahedron is a near-miss Johnson solid. It was first discovered in 2002 by Alex Doskey. It was then independently rediscovered in 2003, and named, by Robert Austin.

It has 28 faces: twelve regular pentagons arranged in four panels of three pentagons each, four equilateral triangles (shown in blue), and six pairs of isosceles triangles (shown in yellow). All edges of the tetrated dodecahedron have the same length, except for the shared bases of these isosceles triangles, which are approximately 1.07 times as long as the other edges. This polyhedron has tetrahedral symmetry.

Topologically, as a near-miss Johnson solid, the four triangles corresponding to the face planes of a tetrahedron are always equilateral, while the pentagons and the other triangles only have reflection symmetry.

== Dual Polyhedron ==
The dual polyhedron of the tetrated dodecahedron consists of triangular, trapezoidal, and rhombic faces. It has 28 faces.

== Related polyhedra ==
Dodecahedron (Platonic solid)	Icosidodecahedron (Archimedean solid)	Pentagonal orthobirotunda (Johnson solid)
