= Compound of tetrahedra =

A compound of tetrahedra might be:

- Compound of two tetrahedra – stellated octahedron
  - Compound of two truncated tetrahedra
- Compound of three tetrahedra
- Compound of four tetrahedra
- Compound of five tetrahedra
- Compound of six tetrahedra
  - Compound of six tetrahedra with rotational freedom
- Compound of ten tetrahedra
  - Compound of ten truncated tetrahedra
- Compound of twelve tetrahedra with rotational freedom
