= Compound of four tetrahedra =

Polyhedral compound

Compound of 4 digonal antiprisms
Type	Uniform compound
Index	UC_{23} (n=4, p=2, q=1)
Polyhedra	4 digonal antiprisms (tetrahedra)
Faces	16 triangles
Edges	32
Vertices	16
Symmetry group	D_{8h}, order 32
Subgroup restricting to one stella octangula	O_{h}, order 48; D_{4h}, order 16

3D model of a compound of four tetrahedra or digonal antiprisms.

In geometry, a compound of four tetrahedra can be constructed by four tetrahedra in a number of different symmetry positions.

== Uniform compounds ==
A uniform compound of four tetrahedra can be constructed by rotating tetrahedra along an axis of symmetry C_{2} (that is the middle of an edge) in multiples of $\pi/4$. It has dihedral symmetry, D_{8h}, and the same vertex arrangement as the convex octagonal prism.

This compound can also be seen as two compounds of stella octangulae fit evenly on the same C_{2} plane of symmetry, with one pair of tetrahedra shifted $\pi/4$. It is a special case of a p/q-gonal prismatic compound of antiprisms, where in this case the component p/q = 2 is a digonal antiprism, or tetrahedron.

Below are two perspective viewpoints of the uniform compound of four tetrahedra, with each color representing one regular tetrahedron:

Perspectives
Top view	Side view

Four tetrahedra that are not spread equally in $\pi/4$ angles over C_{2} can still hold uniform symmetry when allowed rotational freedom. In this case, these tetrahedra share a symmetric arrangement over the common axis of symmetry C_{2} that is rotated by equal and opposite angles. This compound is indexed as UC_{22}, with parameters p/q = 2 and n = 4 as well.

== Other compounds ==
A nonuniform compound can be generated by rotating tetrahedra about lines extending from the center of each face and through the centroid (as altitudes), with varying degrees of rotation.

A model for this compound polyhedron was first published by Robert Webb, using his program Stella, in 2004, following studies of polyhedron models:

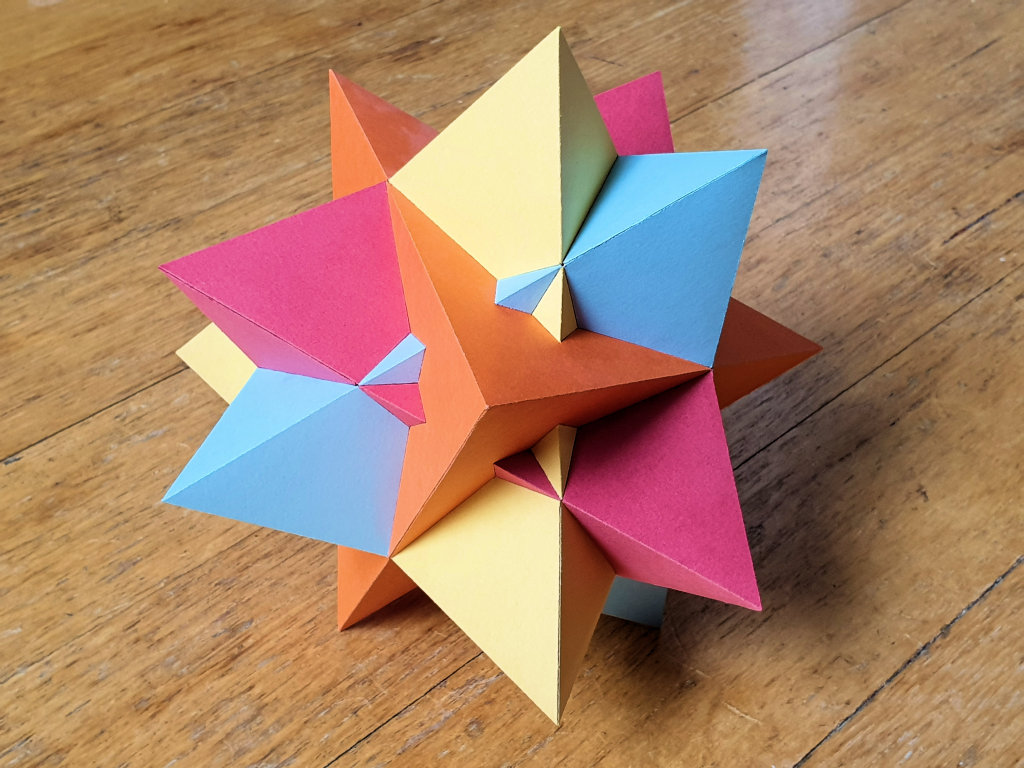
Compound of four tetrahedra rotated by $\pi/3$. This particular model was built by Robert Webb using Stella, a computer software for generating polyhedra.

With edge-length as a unit, it has a surface area equal to

$S=\frac{1291}{210\cdot\sqrt3} \approx 3.5493$.

This compound is self-dual, meaning its dual polyhedron is the same compound polyhedron.

== See also ==
- Compound of three tetrahedra
- Compound of five tetrahedra
- Compound of six tetrahedra
