= Compound of eight triangular prisms =

Polyhedral compound

Compound of eight triangular prisms
| Type | Uniform compound |
| Index | UC_{31} |
| Polyhedra | 8 triangular prisms |
| Faces | 16 triangles, 24 squares |
| Edges | 72 |
| Vertices | 48 |
| Symmetry group | octahedral (O_{h}) |
| Subgroup restricting to one constituent | 3-fold dihedral (D_{3}) |

This uniform polyhedron compound is a symmetric arrangement of 8 triangular prisms, aligned in pairs with the axes of three-fold rotational symmetry of an octahedron. It results from composing the two enantiomorphs of the compound of 4 triangular prisms.
