= Prismatic compound of prisms with rotational freedom =

Polyhedral compound

Compound of 2n p/q-gonal prisms with rotational freedom
(n=2, p=4, q=1)
Type	Uniform compound
Index	UC_{20}
Polyhedra	2n p/q-gonal prisms
Faces	4n {p/q}, 2np squares
Edges	6np
Vertices	4np
Symmetry group	np-fold prismatic (D_{nph})
Subgroup restricting to one constituent	p-fold rotation (C_{ph})

Each member of this infinite family of uniform polyhedron compounds is a symmetric arrangement of prisms sharing a common axis of rotational symmetry. It arises from superimposing two copies of the corresponding prismatic compound of prisms (without rotational freedom), and rotating each copy by an equal and opposite angle.

This infinite family can be enumerated as follows:

- For each positive integer n>0 and for each rational number p/q>2 (expressed with p and q coprime), there occurs the compound of 2n p/q-gonal prisms (with rotational freedom), with symmetry group D_{nph}.
