= Compound of octahedra =

A compound of octahedra may be:

- Compound of two octahedra
- Compound of three octahedra
  - Also Compound of three triangular antiprisms
- Compound of four octahedra
  - More generally, Compound of four octahedra with rotational freedom
- Compound of five octahedra
- Compound of eight octahedra with rotational freedom
- Compound of ten octahedra
- Compound of twenty octahedra
  - More generally, Compound of twenty octahedra with rotational freedom
