= Compound of six tetrahedra with rotational freedom =

Polyhedral compound

Compound of six tetrahedra with rotational freedom
Type	Uniform compound
Index	UC_{1}
Polyhedra	6 tetrahedra
Faces	24 triangles
Edges	36
Vertices	24
Symmetry group	tetrahedral (T_{d})
Subgroup restricting to one constituent	4-fold improper rotation (S_{4})

The compound of six tetrahedra with rotational freedom is a uniform polyhedron compound made of a symmetric arrangement of 6 tetrahedra, considered as antiprisms. It can be constructed by superimposing six tetrahedra within a cube, and then rotating them in pairs about the three axes that pass through the centres of two opposite cubic faces. Each tetrahedron is rotated by an equal (and opposite, within a pair) angle θ. Equivalently, a tetrahedron may be inscribed within each cube in the compound of six cubes with rotational freedom, in such a way as to preserve tetrahedral symmetry.

When θ = 0, all six tetrahedra coincide. When θ is 45 degrees, the more symmetric compound of six tetrahedra (without rotational freedom) arises. Otherwise, the compound of six tetrahedra with rotational freedom shares the same vertex arrangement as a nonuniform truncated octahedron in a way related to a beveled tetrahedron.

== Gallery ==
Compounds of six tetrahedra with rotational freedom

File:Tetrahedron.stlθ = 0°

File:Compound_of_six_tetrahedra_with_rotational_freedom_(5°).stlθ = 5°

File:Compound_of_six_tetrahedra_with_rotational_freedom_(10°).stlθ = 10°

File:Compound_of_six_tetrahedra_with_rotational_freedom_(15°).stlθ = 15°

File:Compound_of_six_tetrahedra_with_rotational_freedom_(20°).stlθ = 20°

File:Compound_of_six_tetrahedra_with_rotational_freedom_(25°).stlθ = 25°

File:Compound_of_six_tetrahedra_with_rotational_freedom_(30°).stlθ = 30°

File:Compound_of_six_tetrahedra_with_rotational_freedom_(35°).stlθ = 35°

File:Compound_of_six_tetrahedra_with_rotational_freedom_(40°).stlθ = 40°

File:Compound_of_six_tetrahedra.stlθ = 45°
