= Compound of five great dodecahedra =

Polyhedral compound

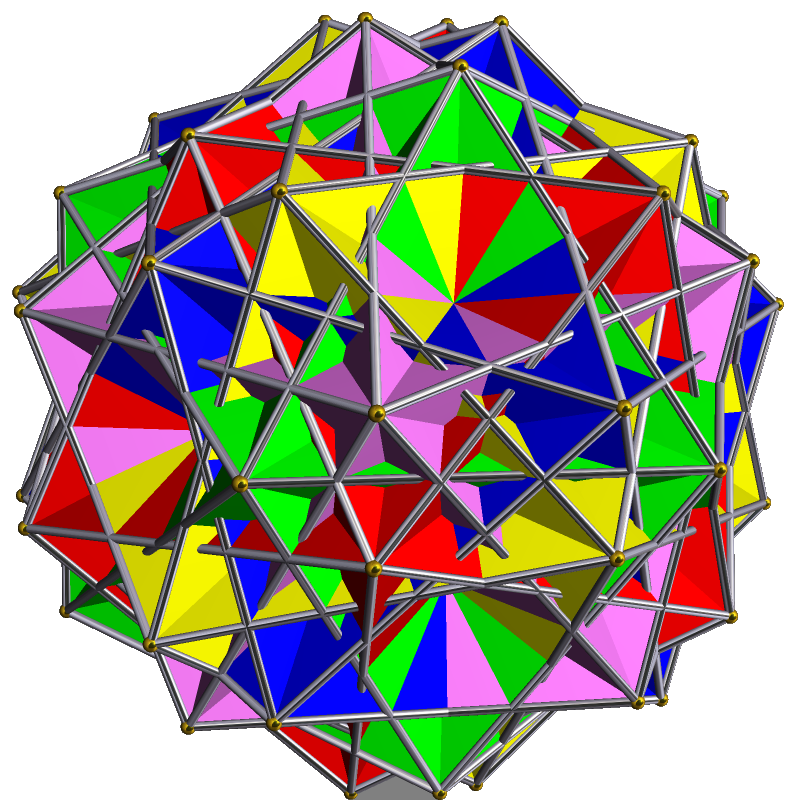
Compound of five great dodecahedra
Type	Uniform compound
Index	UC_{49}
Polyhedra	5 great dodecahedra
Faces	60 pentagons
Edges	150
Vertices	60
Symmetry group	icosahedral (I_{h})
Subgroup restricting to one constituent	pyritohedral (T_{h})

This uniform polyhedron compound is a composition of 5 great dodecahedra, in the same arrangement as in the compound of 5 icosahedra.

It is one of only five polyhedral compounds (along with the compound of six tetrahedra, the compound of two great dodecahedra, the compound of two small stellated dodecahedra, and the compound of five small stellated dodecahedra) which is vertex-transitive and face-transitive but not edge-transitive.
