= Compound of four hexagonal prisms =

Polyhedral compound

Compound of four hexagonal prisms
Type	Uniform compound
Index	UC_{38}
Polyhedra	4 hexagonal prisms
Faces	8 hexagons, 24 squares
Edges	72
Vertices	48
Symmetry group	octahedral (O_{h})
Subgroup restricting to one constituent	3-fold antiprismatic (D_{3d})

This uniform polyhedron compound is a symmetric arrangement of 4 hexagonal prisms, aligned with the axes of threefold rotational symmetry of an octahedron. It shares the same vertex arrangement as a nonuniform truncated cuboctahedron.

== Cartesian coordinates ==
Cartesian coordinates for the vertices of this compound are all the permutations of

(±1, ±(1−√6), ±(1+√6))
