= Compound of ten truncated tetrahedra =

Polyhedral compound

Compound of ten truncated tetrahedra
Type	Uniform compound
Index	UC_{56}
Polyhedra	10 truncated tetrahedra
Faces	40 triangles, 40 hexagons
Edges	180
Vertices	120
Symmetry group	icosahedral (I_{h})
Subgroup restricting to one constituent	chiral tetrahedral (T)

This uniform polyhedron compound is a composition of 10 truncated tetrahedra, formed by truncating each of the tetrahedra in the compound of 10 tetrahedra. It also results from composing the two enantiomers of the compound of 5 truncated tetrahedra. It could also be called a truncated icosicosahedron.

== Cartesian coordinates ==
Cartesian coordinates for the vertices of this compound are all the even permutations of

(±1, ±1, ±3)
(±τ^{−1}, ±(−τ^{−2}), ±2τ)
(±τ, ±(−2τ^{−1}), ±τ^{2})
(±τ^{2}, ±(−τ^{−2}), ±2)
(±(2τ−1), ±1, ±(2τ − 1))

where τ = (1+√5)/2 is the golden ratio (sometimes written φ).
