= Compound of five cubohemioctahedra =

Polyhedral compound

Compound of five cubohemioctahedra
| Type | Uniform compound |
| Index | UC_{60} |
| Polyhedra | 5 cubohemioctahedra |
| Faces | 30 squares, 20 hexagons |
| Edges | 120 |
| Vertices | 60 |
| Symmetry group | icosahedral (I_{h}) |
| Subgroup restricting to one constituent | pyritohedral (T_{h}) |

This uniform polyhedron compound is a composition of 5 cubohemioctahedra, in the same arrangement as in the compound of 5 cuboctahedra.

== Filling ==
There is some controversy on how to colour the faces of this polyhedron compound. Although the common way to fill in a polygon is to just colour its whole interior, this can result in some filled regions hanging as membranes over empty space. Hence, the "neo filling" is sometimes used instead as a more accurate filling. In the neo filling, orientable polyhedra are filled traditionally, but non-orientable polyhedra have their faces filled with the modulo-2 method (only odd-density regions are filled in). In addition, overlapping regions of coplanar faces can cancel each other out.

| Traditional filling | "Neo filling" |
