= Compound of five great rhombihexahedra =

Polyhedral compound

Compound of five great rhombihexahedra
Type	Uniform compound
Index	UC_{66}
Polyhedra	5 great rhombihexahedra
Faces	60 squares, 30 octagrams
Edges	240
Vertices	120
Symmetry group	icosahedral (I_{h})
Subgroup restricting to one constituent	pyritohedral (T_{h})

This uniform polyhedron compound is a composition of 5 great rhombihexahedra, in the same vertex arrangement as the compound of 5 truncated cubes.

== Filling ==
There is some controversy on how to colour the faces of this polyhedron compound. Although the common way to fill in a polygon is to just colour its whole interior, this can result in some filled regions hanging as membranes over empty space. Hence, the "neo filling" is sometimes used instead as a more accurate filling. In the neo filling, orientable polyhedra are filled traditionally, but non-orientable polyhedra have their faces filled with the modulo-2 method (only odd-density regions are filled in). In addition, overlapping regions of coplanar faces can cancel each other out.

Traditional filling	"Neo filling"
