= Compound of four triangular prisms =

Polyhedral compound

Compound of four triangular prisms
Type	Uniform compound
Index	UC_{30}
Polyhedra	4 triangular prisms
Faces	8 triangles, 12 squares
Edges	36
Vertices	24
Symmetry group	chiral octahedral (O)
Subgroup restricting to one constituent	3-fold dihedral (D_{3})

This uniform polyhedron compound is a chiral symmetric arrangement of 4 triangular prisms, aligned with the axes of three-fold rotational symmetry of an octahedron.

== Cartesian coordinates ==
Cartesian coordinates for the vertices of this compound are all the even permutations of

(±1, ±(1+√2), ±(1−√2))

with an even number of minuses in the '±' choices, together with all the odd permutations with an odd number of minuses in the '±' choices.
