= List of spherical symmetry groups =

Selected point groups in three dimensions
Involutional symmetry C_{s}, (*) [ ] =	Cyclic symmetry C_{nv}, (*nn) [n] =	Dihedral symmetry D_{nh}, (*n22) [n,2] =
Polyhedral group, [n,3], (*n32)
Tetrahedral symmetry T_{d}, (*332) [3,3] =	Octahedral symmetry O_{h}, (*432) [4,3] =	Icosahedral symmetry I_{h}, (*532) [5,3] =

Finite spherical symmetry groups are also called point groups in three dimensions. There are five fundamental symmetry classes which have triangular fundamental domains: dihedral, cyclic, tetrahedral, octahedral, and icosahedral symmetry.

This article lists the groups by Schoenflies notation, Coxeter notation, orbifold notation, and order. John Conway used a variation of the Schoenflies notation, based on the groups' quaternion algebraic structure, labeled by one or two upper case letters, and whole number subscripts. The group order is defined as the subscript, unless the order is doubled for symbols with a plus or minus, "±", prefix, which implies a central inversion.

Hermann–Mauguin notation (International notation) is also given. The crystallography groups, 32 in total, are a subset with element orders 2, 3, 4 and 6.

== Involutional symmetry ==
There are four involutional groups: no symmetry (C_{1}), reflection symmetry (C_{s}), 2-fold rotational symmetry (C_{2}), and central point symmetry (C_{i}).

Intl	Geo	Orbifold	Schönflies	Conway	Coxeter	Order	Abstract	Fund. domain
1	1̅	11	C_{1}	C_{1}	][ [ ]^{+}	1	Z_{1}	
2	2̅	22	D_{1} = C_{2}	D_{2} = C_{2}	[2]^{+}	2	Z_{2}	
1̅	2̅2̅	×	C_{i} = S_{2}	CC_{2} = CD_{2}	[2^{+},2^{+}]	2	Z_{2}	
2̅ = m	1	*	C_{s} = C_{1v} = C_{1h}	±C_{1}	[ ]	2	Z_{2}	

== Cyclic symmetry ==
There are four infinite cyclic symmetry families, with n = 2 or higher. (n may be 1 as a special case as no symmetry)

Intl	Geo	Orbifold	Schönflies	Conway	Coxeter	Order	Abstract	Fund. domain
4̅	4̅2̅	2×	S_{4}	CC_{4}	[2^{+},4^{+}]	4	Z_{4}	
2/m	2̅2	2*	C_{2h} = D_{1d}	±C_{2} = ±D_{2}	[2,2^{+}] [2^{+},2]	4	D_{4}	

Intl	Geo	Orbifold	Schönflies	Conway	Coxeter	Order	Abstract	Fund. domain
2; 3; 4; 5; 6 n	2̅; 3̅; 4̅; 5̅; 6̅ n̅	22; 33; 44; 55; 66 nn	C_{2} C_{3} C_{4} C_{5} C_{6} C_{n}	C_{2} C_{3} C_{4} C_{5} C_{6} C_{n}	[2]^{+} [3]^{+} [4]^{+} [5]^{+} [6]^{+} [n]^{+}	2; 3; 4; 5; 6 n	Z_{2} Z_{3} Z_{4} Z_{5} Z_{6} Z_{n}	
2mm 3m 4mm 5m 6mm nm (n is odd) nmm (n is even)	2; 3; 4; 5; 6 n	*22; *33; *44; *55; *66 *nn	C_{2v} C_{3v} C_{4v} C_{5v} C_{6v} C_{nv}	CD_{4} CD_{6} CD_{8} CD_{10} CD_{12} CD_{2n}	[2] [3] [4] [5] [6] [n]	4; 6; 8; 10; 12; 2n	D_{4} D_{6} D_{8} D_{10} D_{12} D_{2n}	
3̅; 8̅; 5̅; 1̅2̅ -	6̅2̅; 8̅2̅; 1̅0̅.2̅; 1̅2̅.2̅; 2̅n̅.2̅	3× 4× 5× 6× n×	S_{6} S_{8} S_{10} S_{12} S_{2n}	±C_{3} CC_{8} ±C_{5} CC_{12} CC_{2n} / ±C_{n}	[2^{+},6^{+}] [2^{+},8^{+}] [2^{+},10^{+}] [2^{+},12^{+}] [2^{+},2n^{+}]	6; 8; 10; 12; 2n	Z_{6} Z_{8} Z_{10} Z_{12} Z_{2n}	
3/m=6̅ 4/m 5/m=1̅0̅ 6/m n/m	3̅2; 4̅2; 5̅2; 6̅2 n̅2	3*; 4*; 5*; 6* n*	C_{3h} C_{4h} C_{5h} C_{6h} C_{nh}	CC_{6} ±C_{4} CC_{10} ±C_{6} ±C_{n} / CC_{2n}	[2,3^{+}] [2,4^{+}] [2,5^{+}] [2,6^{+}] [2,n^{+}]	6; 8; 10; 12; 2n	Z_{6} Z_{2}×Z_{4} Z_{10} Z_{2}×Z_{6} Z_{2}×Z_{n} ≅Z_{2n} (odd n)	

== Dihedral symmetry ==
There are three infinite dihedral symmetry families, with n = 2 or higher (n may be 1 as a special case).

Intl	Geo	Orbifold	Schönflies	Conway	Coxeter	Order	Abstract	Fund. domain
222	2̅.2̅	222	D_{2}	D_{4}	[2,2]^{+}	4	D_{4}	
4̅2m	42̅	2*2	D_{2d}	DD_{8}	[2^{+},4]	8	D_{8}	
mmm	22	*222	D_{2h}	±D_{4}	[2,2]	8	Z_{2}×D_{4}	

Intl	Geo	Orbifold	Schönflies	Conway	Coxeter	Order	Abstract	Fund. domain
32; 422; 52; 622	3̅.2̅; 4̅.2̅; 5̅.2̅; 6̅.2̅ n̅.2̅	223; 224; 225; 226; 22n	D_{3} D_{4} D_{5} D_{6} D_{n}	D_{6} D_{8} D_{10} D_{12} D_{2n}	[2,3]^{+} [2,4]^{+} [2,5]^{+} [2,6]^{+} [2,n]^{+}	6; 8; 10; 12; 2n	D_{6} D_{8} D_{10} D_{12} D_{2n}	
3̅m 8̅2m 5̅m 1̅2̅.2m	62̅; 82̅; 10.2̅; 12.2̅ n2̅	2*3; 2*4; 2*5; 2*6; 2*n	D_{3d} D_{4d} D_{5d} D_{6d} D_{nd}	±D_{6} DD_{16} ±D_{10} DD_{24} DD_{4n} / ±D_{2n}	[2^{+},6] [2^{+},8] [2^{+},10] [2^{+},12] [2^{+},2n]	12; 16; 20; 24; 4n	D_{12} D_{16} D_{20} D_{24} D_{4n}	
6̅m2 4/mmm 1̅0̅m2 6/mmm	32; 42; 52; 62 n2	*223; *224; *225; *226; *22n	D_{3h} D_{4h} D_{5h} D_{6h} D_{nh}	DD_{12} ±D_{8} DD_{20} ±D_{12} ±D_{2n} / DD_{4n}	[2,3] [2,4] [2,5] [2,6] [2,n]	12; 16; 20; 24; 4n	D_{12} Z_{2}×D_{8} D_{20} Z_{2}×D_{12} Z_{2}×D_{2n} ≅D_{4n} (odd n)	

== Polyhedral symmetry ==
There are three types of polyhedral symmetry: tetrahedral symmetry, octahedral symmetry, and icosahedral symmetry, named after the triangle-faced regular polyhedra with these symmetries.

Tetrahedral symmetry
Intl	Geo	Orbifold	Schönflies	Conway	Coxeter	Order	Abstract	Fund. domain
23	3̅.3̅	332	T	T	[3,3]^{+}	12	A_{4}	
m3̅	43̅	3*2	T_{h}	±T	[4,3^{+}]	24	2×A_{4}	
4̅3m	33	*332	T_{d}	TO	[3,3]	24	S_{4}	

Octahedral symmetry
Intl	Geo	Orbifold	Schönflies	Conway	Coxeter	Order	Abstract	Fund. domain
432	4̅.3̅	432	O	O	[4,3]^{+}	24	S_{4}	
m3̅m	43	*432	O_{h}	±O	[4,3]	48	2×S_{4}	

Icosahedral symmetry
Intl	Geo	Orbifold	Schönflies	Conway	Coxeter	Order	Abstract	Fund. domain
532	5̅.3̅	532	I	I	[5,3]^{+}	60	A_{5}	
5̅3̅2/m	53	*532	I_{h}	±I	[5,3]	120	2×A_{5}	

== Continuous symmetries ==
All of the discrete point symmetries are subgroups of certain continuous symmetries. They can be classified as products of orthogonal groups O(n) or special orthogonal groups SO(n). O(1) is a single orthogonal reflection, dihedral symmetry order 2, Dih_{1}. SO(1) is just the identity. Half turns, C_{2}, are needed to complete.

Rank 3 groups	Other names	Example geometry	Example finite subgroups
O(3)		Full symmetry of the sphere	[3,3] =, [4,3] =, [5,3] = [4,3^{+}] =
SO(3)	Sphere group	Rotational symmetry	[3,3]^{+} =, [4,3]^{+} =, [5,3]^{+} =
O(2)×O(1); O(2)⋊C_{2}	Dih_{∞}×Dih_{1} Dih_{∞}⋊C_{2}	Full symmetry of a spheroid, torus, cylinder, bicone or hyperboloid Full circular symmetry with half turn	[p,2] = [p]×[ ] = [2p,2^{+}] =, [2p^{+},2^{+}] =
SO(2)×O(1)	C_{∞}×Dih_{1}	Rotational symmetry with reflection	[p^{+},2] = [p]^{+}×[ ] =
SO(2)⋊C_{2}	C_{∞}⋊C_{2}	Rotational symmetry with half turn	[p,2]^{+} =
O(2)×SO(1)	Dih_{∞} Circular symmetry	Full symmetry of a hemisphere, cone, paraboloid or any surface of revolution	[p,1] = [p] =
SO(2)×SO(1)	C_{∞} Circle group	Rotational symmetry	[p,1]^{+} = [p]^{+} =

== See also ==
- Crystallographic point group
- List of planar symmetry groups
- Point groups in two dimensions
- Triangle group
