= Compound of five octahemioctahedra =

Polyhedral compound

Compound of five octahemioctahedra
Type	Uniform compound
Index	UC_{61}
Polyhedra	5 octahemioctahedra
Faces	40 triangles, 20 hexagons
Edges	120
Vertices	60
Symmetry group	icosahedral (I_{h})
Subgroup restricting to one constituent	pyritohedral (T_{h})

In geometry, this uniform polyhedron compound is a composition of 5 octahemioctahedra, in the same vertex arrangement as in the compound of 5 cuboctahedra. It could also be called an icosidisicosahedron.

== Filling ==
There is some controversy on how to colour the faces of this polyhedron compound. Although the common way to fill in a polygon is to just colour its whole interior, this can result in some filled regions hanging as membranes over empty space. Hence, the "neo filling" is sometimes used instead as a more accurate filling. In the neo filling, orientable polyhedra are filled traditionally, but non-orientable polyhedra have their faces filled with the modulo-2 method (only odd-density regions are filled in). In addition, overlapping regions of coplanar faces can cancel each other out. Usage of the "neo filling" makes the compound of five octahemioctahedra a hollow polyhedron compound.

Traditional filling	"Neo filling"
