= Prismatic compound of antiprisms with rotational freedom =

Polyhedral compound

Compound of 2n p/q-gonal antiprisms
(n=2, p=3, q=1) / (n=1, p=7, q=2)
Type	Uniform compound
Index	q odd: UC_{22}; q even: UC_{24}
Polyhedra	2n p/q-gonal antiprisms
Faces	4n {p/q} (unless p/q=2), 4np triangles
Edges	8np
Vertices	4np
Symmetry group	nq odd: np-fold antiprismatic (D_{npd}); nq even: np-fold prismatic (D_{nph})
Subgroup restricting to one constituent	q odd: 2p-fold improper rotation (S_{2p}); q even: p-fold rotation (C_{ph})

Each member of this infinite family of uniform polyhedron compounds is a symmetric arrangement of antiprisms sharing a common axis of rotational symmetry. It arises from superimposing two copies of the corresponding prismatic compound of antiprisms (without rotational freedom), and rotating each copy by an equal and opposite angle.

This infinite family can be enumerated as follows:

- For each positive integer n>0 and for each rational number p/q>3/2 (expressed with p and q coprime), there occurs the compound of 2n p/q-gonal antiprisms (with rotational freedom), with symmetry group:
  - D_{npd} if nq is odd
  - D_{nph} if nq is even

Where p/q=2 the component is a tetrahedron, sometimes not considered a true antiprism.
