= Compound of five great cubicuboctahedra =

Polyhedral compound

Compound of five great cubicuboctahedra
Type	Uniform compound
Index	UC_{65}
Polyhedra	5 great cubicuboctahedra
Faces	40 triangles, 30 squares, 30 octagrams
Edges	240
Vertices	120
Symmetry group	icosahedral (I_{h})
Subgroup restricting to one constituent	pyritohedral (T_{h})

This uniform polyhedron compound is a composition of 5 great cubicuboctahedra, in the same arrangement as the compound of 5 truncated cubes.
