= Compound of five nonconvex great rhombicuboctahedra =

Polyhedral compound

Compound of five nonconvex great rhombicuboctahedra
Type	Uniform compound
Index	UC_{67}
Polyhedra	5 nonconvex great rhombicuboctahedra
Faces	40 triangles, 30+60 squares
Edges	240
Vertices	120
Symmetry group	Icosahedral (I_{h})
Subgroup restricting to one constituent	Pyritohedral (T_{h})

This uniform polyhedron compound is a composition of 5 nonconvex great rhombicuboctahedra, in the same arrangement (i.e. sharing vertices with) the compound of 5 truncated cubes.
