= Compound of two small stellated dodecahedra =

Polyhedral compound

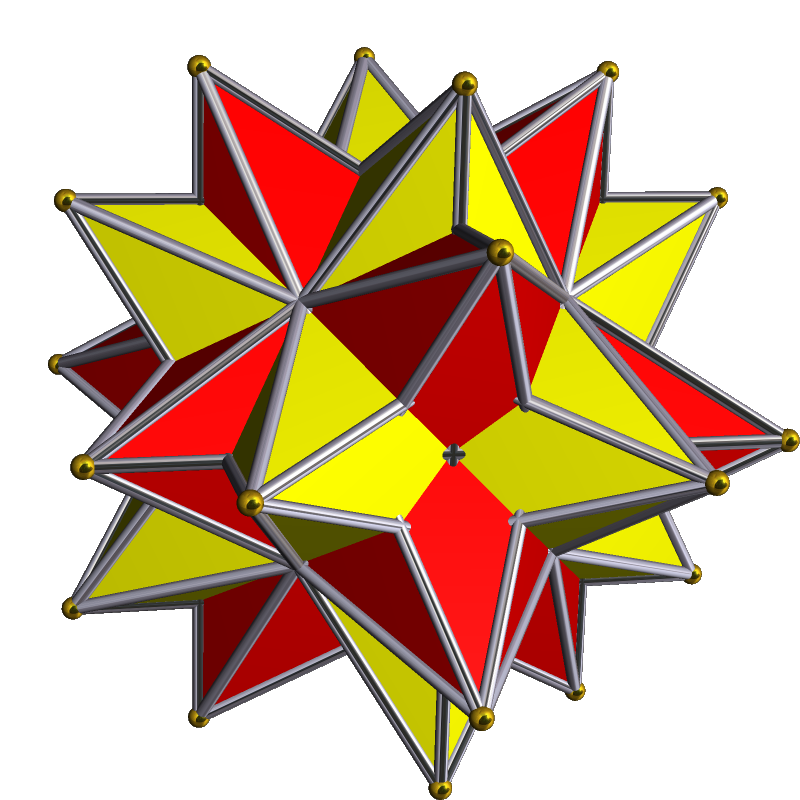
- Type: Uniform compound
- Faces: 24 pentagrams
- Edges: 60
- Vertices: 24
- Symmetry group: octahedral (O_{h})
- Dual polyhedron: great dodecahedron

3D model of a compound of two small stellated dodecahedra

This uniform polyhedron compound is a composition of 2 small stellated dodecahedra, in the same arrangement as in the compound of 2 icosahedra.

It is one of only five polyhedral compounds (along with the compound of six tetrahedra, the compound of two great dodecahedra, the compound of five great dodecahedra, and the compound of five small stellated dodecahedra) which is vertex-transitive and face-transitive but not edge-transitive.

Its convex hull is a nonuniform truncated octahedron.
