= Compound of five small cubicuboctahedra =

Polyhedral compound

Compound of five small cubicuboctahedra
Type	Uniform compound
Index	UC_{64}
Polyhedra	5 small cubicuboctahedra
Faces	40 triangles, 30 squares, 30 octagons
Edges	240
Vertices	120
Symmetry group	icosahedral (I_{h})
Subgroup restricting to one constituent	pyritohedral (T_{h})

This uniform polyhedron compound is a composition of 5 small cubicuboctahedra, in the same vertex arrangement as the compound of 5 small rhombicuboctahedra.
