= Compound of five small rhombihexahedra =

Polyhedral compound

Compound of five small rhombihexahedra
| Type | Uniform compound |
| Index | UC_{63} |
| Polyhedra | 5 small rhombihexahedra |
| Faces | 60 squares, 30 octagons |
| Edges | 240 |
| Vertices | 120 |
| Symmetry group | icosahedral (I_{h}) |
| Subgroup restricting to one constituent | pyritohedral (T_{h}) |

3D model of a compound of five small rhombihexahedra

This uniform polyhedron compound is a composition of 5 small rhombihexahedra, in the same vertex and edge arrangement as the compound of 5 small rhombicuboctahedra.
