= Uniform polyhedron compound =

Compound shape made of identical uniform polyhedra arranged uniformly

In geometry, a uniform polyhedron compound is a polyhedral compound whose constituents are identical (although possibly enantiomorphous) uniform polyhedra, in an arrangement that is also uniform, i.e. the symmetry group of the compound acts transitively on the compound's vertices.

The uniform polyhedron compounds were first enumerated by John Skilling in 1976, with a proof that the enumeration is complete. The following table lists them according to his numbering.

The prismatic compounds of {p/q}-gonal prisms (UC_{20} and UC_{21}) exist only when p/q > 2, and when p and q are coprime. The uniform prismatic compounds of {p/q}-gonal antiprisms (UC_{22}, UC_{23}, UC_{24} and UC_{25}) exist only when p/q > 3/2, and when p and q are coprime. Furthermore, when p/q = 2, the antiprisms degenerate into tetrahedra with digonal bases.

Compound	Bowers acronym	Picture	Polyhedral count	Polyhedral type	Faces	Edges	Vertices	Notes	Symmetry group	Subgroup restricting to one constituent
UC_{01}	sis		6	tetrahedra	24{3}	36	24	Rotational freedom	T_{d}	S_{4}
UC_{02}	dis		12	tetrahedra	48{3}	72	48	Rotational freedom	O_{h}	S_{4}
UC_{03}	snu		6	tetrahedra	24{3}	36	24		O_{h}	D_{2d}
UC_{04}	so		2	tetrahedra	8{3}	12	8	Regular	O_{h}	T_{d}
UC_{05}	ki		5	tetrahedra	20{3}	30	20	Regular	I	T
UC_{06}	e		10	tetrahedra	40{3}	60	20	Regular 2 polyhedra per vertex	I_{h}	T
UC_{07}	risdoh		6	cubes	(12+24){4}	72	48	Rotational freedom	O_{h}	C_{4h}
UC_{08}	rah		3	cubes	(6+12){4}	36	24		O_{h}	D_{4h}
UC_{09}	rhom		5	cubes	30{4}	60	20	Regular 2 polyhedra per vertex	I_{h}	T_{h}
UC_{10}	dissit		4	octahedra	(8+24){3}	48	24	Rotational freedom	T_{h}	S_{6}
UC_{11}	daso		8	octahedra	(16+48){3}	96	48	Rotational freedom	O_{h}	S_{6}
UC_{12}	sno		4	octahedra	(8+24){3}	48	24		O_{h}	D_{3d}
UC_{13}	addasi		20	octahedra	(40+120){3}	240	120	Rotational freedom	I_{h}	S_{6}
UC_{14}	dasi		20	octahedra	(40+120){3}	240	60	2 polyhedra per vertex	I_{h}	S_{6}
UC_{15}	gissi		10	octahedra	(20+60){3}	120	60		I_{h}	D_{3d}
UC_{16}	si		10	octahedra	(20+60){3}	120	60		I_{h}	D_{3d}
UC_{17}	se		5	octahedra	40{3}	60	30	Regular	I_{h}	T_{h}
UC_{18}	hirki		5	tetrahemihexahedra	20{3} 15{4}	60	30		I	T
UC_{19}	sapisseri		20	tetrahemihexahedra	(20+60){3} 60{4}	240	60	2 polyhedra per vertex	I	C_{3}
UC_{20}	-		2n (2n ≥ 2)	p/q-gonal prisms	4n{p/q} 2np{4}	6np	4np	Rotational freedom	D_{nph}	C_{ph}
UC_{21}	-		n (n ≥ 2)	p/q-gonal prisms	2n{p/q} np{4}	3np	2np		D_{nph}	D_{ph}
UC_{22}	-		2n (2n ≥ 2) (q odd)	p/q-gonal antiprisms (q odd)	4n{p/q} (if p/q ≠ 2) 4np{3}	8np	4np	Rotational freedom	D_{npd} (if n odd) D_{nph} (if n even)	S_{2p}
UC_{23}	-		n (n ≥ 2)	p/q-gonal antiprisms (q odd)	2n{p/q} (if p/q ≠ 2) 2np{3}	4np	2np		D_{npd} (if n odd) D_{nph} (if n even)	D_{pd}
UC_{24}	-		2n (2n ≥ 2)	p/q-gonal antiprisms (q even)	4n{p/q} (if p/q ≠ 2) 4np{3}	8np	4np	Rotational freedom	D_{nph}	C_{ph}
UC_{25}	-		n (n ≥ 2)	p/q-gonal antiprisms (q even)	2n{p/q} (if p/q ≠ 2) 2np{3}	4np	2np		D_{nph}	D_{ph}
UC_{26}	gadsid		12	pentagonal antiprisms	120{3} 24{5}	240	120	Rotational freedom	I_{h}	S_{10}
UC_{27}	gassid		6	pentagonal antiprisms	60{3} 12{5}	120	60		I_{h}	D_{5d}
UC_{28}	gidasid		12	pentagrammic crossed antiprisms	120{3} 24{5/2}	240	120	Rotational freedom	I_{h}	S_{10}
UC_{29}	gissed		6	pentagrammic crossed antiprisms	60{3} 12 5/2	120	60		I_{h}	D_{5d}
UC_{30}	ro		4	triangular prisms	8{3} 12{4}	36	24		O	D_{3}
UC_{31}	dro		8	triangular prisms	16{3} 24{4}	72	48		O_{h}	D_{3}
UC_{32}	kri		10	triangular prisms	20{3} 30{4}	90	60		I	D_{3}
UC_{33}	dri		20	triangular prisms	40{3} 60{4}	180	60	2 polyhedra per vertex	I_{h}	D_{3}
UC_{34}	kred		6	pentagonal prisms	30{4} 12{5}	90	60		I	D_{5}
UC_{35}	dird		12	pentagonal prisms	60{4} 24{5}	180	60	2 polyhedra per vertex	I_{h}	D_{5}
UC_{36}	gikrid		6	pentagrammic prisms	30{4} 12{5/2}	90	60		I	D_{5}
UC_{37}	giddird		12	pentagrammic prisms	60{4} 24{5/2}	180	60	2 polyhedra per vertex	I_{h}	D_{5}
UC_{38}	griso		4	hexagonal prisms	24{4} 8{6}	72	48		O_{h}	D_{3d}
UC_{39}	rosi		10	hexagonal prisms	60{4} 20{6}	180	120		I_{h}	D_{3d}
UC_{40}	rassid		6	decagonal prisms	60{4} 12{10}	180	120		I_{h}	D_{5d}
UC_{41}	grassid		6	decagrammic prisms	60{4} 12{10/3}	180	120		I_{h}	D_{5d}
UC_{42}	gassic		3	square antiprisms	24{3} 6{4}	48	24		O	D_{4}
UC_{43}	gidsac		6	square antiprisms	48{3} 12{4}	96	48		O_{h}	D_{4}
UC_{44}	sassid		6	pentagrammic antiprisms	60{3} 12{5/2}	120	60		I	D_{5}
UC_{45}	sadsid		12	pentagrammic antiprisms	120{3} 24{5/2}	240	120		I_{h}	D_{5}
UC_{46}	siddo		2	icosahedra	(16+24){3}	60	24		O_{h}	T_{h}
UC_{47}	sne		5	icosahedra	(40+60){3}	150	60		I_{h}	T_{h}
UC_{48}	presipsido		2	great dodecahedra	24{5}	60	24		O_{h}	T_{h}
UC_{49}	presipsi		5	great dodecahedra	60{5}	150	60		I_{h}	T_{h}
UC_{50}	passipsido		2	small stellated dodecahedra	24{5/2}	60	24		O_{h}	T_{h}
UC_{51}	passipsi		5	small stellated dodecahedra	60{5/2}	150	60		I_{h}	T_{h}
UC_{52}	sirsido		2	great icosahedra	(16+24){3}	60	24		O_{h}	T_{h}
UC_{53}	sirsei		5	great icosahedra	(40+60){3}	150	60		I_{h}	T_{h}
UC_{54}	tisso		2	truncated tetrahedra	8{3} 8{6}	36	24		O_{h}	T_{d}
UC_{55}	taki		5	truncated tetrahedra	20{3} 20{6}	90	60		I	T
UC_{56}	te		10	truncated tetrahedra	40{3} 40{6}	180	120		I_{h}	T
UC_{57}	tar		5	truncated cubes	40{3} 30{8}	180	120		I_{h}	T_{h}
UC_{58}	quitar		5	stellated truncated hexahedra	40{3} 30{8/3}	180	120		I_{h}	T_{h}
UC_{59}	arie		5	cuboctahedra	40{3} 30{4}	120	60		I_{h}	T_{h}
UC_{60}	gari		5	cubohemioctahedra	30{4} 20{6}	120	60		I_{h}	T_{h}
UC_{61}	iddei		5	octahemioctahedra	40{3} 20{6}	120	60		I_{h}	T_{h}
UC_{62}	rasseri		5	rhombicuboctahedra	40{3} (30+60){4}	240	120		I_{h}	T_{h}
UC_{63}	rasher		5	small rhombihexahedra	60{4} 30{8}	240	120		I_{h}	T_{h}
UC_{64}	rahrie		5	small cubicuboctahedra	40{3} 30{4} 30{8}	240	120		I_{h}	T_{h}
UC_{65}	raquahri		5	great cubicuboctahedra	40{3} 30{4} 30{8/3}	240	120		I_{h}	T_{h}
UC_{66}	rasquahr		5	great rhombihexahedra	60{4} 30{8/3}	240	120		I_{h}	T_{h}
UC_{67}	rosaqri		5	nonconvex great rhombicuboctahedra	40{3} (30+60){4}	240	120		I_{h}	T_{h}
UC_{68}	disco		2	snub cubes	(16+48){3} 12{4}	120	48		O_{h}	O
UC_{69}	dissid		2	snub dodecahedra	(40+120){3} 24{5}	300	120		I_{h}	I
UC_{70}	giddasid		2	great snub icosidodecahedra	(40+120){3} 24{5/2}	300	120		I_{h}	I
UC_{71}	gidsid		2	great inverted snub icosidodecahedra	(40+120){3} 24{5/2}	300	120		I_{h}	I
UC_{72}	gidrissid		2	great retrosnub icosidodecahedra	(40+120){3} 24{5/2}	300	120		I_{h}	I
UC_{73}	disdid		2	snub dodecadodecahedra	120{3} 24{5} 24{5/2}	300	120		I_{h}	I
UC_{74}	idisdid		2	inverted snub dodecadodecahedra	120{3} 24{5} 24{5/2}	300	120		I_{h}	I
UC_{75}	desided		2	snub icosidodecadodecahedra	(40+120){3} 24{5} 24{5/2}	360	120		I_{h}	I
