= Compound of five great icosahedra =

Polyhedral compound

Compound of five great icosahedra
Type	Uniform compound
Index	UC_{53}
Polyhedra	5 great icosahedra
Faces	40+60 Triangles
Edges	150
Vertices	60
Symmetry group	icosahedral (I_{h})
Subgroup restricting to one constituent	pyritohedral (T_{h})

This uniform polyhedron compound is a composition of 5 great icosahedra, in the same arrangement as in the compound of 5 icosahedra.

Under the action of the symmetry group, the triangles in this compound decompose into two orbits: 40 of the triangles lie in coplanar pairs in icosahedral planes, while the other 60 lie in unique planes.
