= Compound of twelve pentagonal antiprisms with rotational freedom =

Polyhedral compound

Compound of twelve pentagonal antiprisms with rotational freedom
Type	Uniform compound
Index	UC_{26}
Polyhedra	12 pentagonal antiprisms
Faces	120 triangles, 24 pentagons
Edges	240
Vertices	120
Symmetry group	icosahedral (I_{h})
Subgroup restricting to one constituent	10-fold improper rotation (S_{10})

This uniform polyhedron compound is a symmetric arrangement of 12 pentagonal antiprisms. It can be constructed by inscribing one pair of pentagonal antiprisms within an icosahedron, in each of the six possible ways, and then rotating each by an equal and opposite angle θ.

When θ is 36 degrees, the antiprisms coincide in pairs to yield (two superimposed copies of) the compound of six pentagonal antiprisms (without rotational freedom).

This compound shares its vertices with the compound of twelve pentagrammic crossed antiprisms with rotational freedom.

== Cartesian coordinates ==
Cartesian coordinates for the vertices of this compound are all the cyclic permutations of

(±(2τ−1−(2τ+4)cos θ), ±2(√(5τ+10))sin θ, ±(τ+2+(4τ−2)cos θ))
(±(2τ−1−(2τ−1)cos θ−τ(√(5τ+10))sin θ), ±(−5τcos θ+τ^{−1}(√(5τ+10))sin θ),

±(τ+2+(3−τ)cos θ+(√(5τ+10))sin θ))

(±(2τ−1+(1+3τ)cos θ−(√(5τ+10))sin θ), ±(−5cos θ−τ(√(5τ+10))sin θ),

±(τ+2−(τ+2)cos θ+τ^{−1}(√(5τ+10))sin θ))

(±(2τ−1+(1+3τ)cos θ+(√(5τ+10))sin θ), ±(5cos θ−τ(√(5τ+10))sin θ),

±(τ+2−(τ+2)cos θ−τ^{−1}(√(5τ+10))sin θ))

(±(2τ−1−(2τ−1)cos θ+τ(√(5τ+10))sin θ), ±(5τcos θ+τ^{−1}(√(5τ+10))sin θ),

±(τ+2+(3−τ)cos θ−(√(5τ+10))sin θ))

where τ = (1+√5)/2 is the golden ratio (sometimes written φ).
