= Compound of six decagrammic prisms =

Polyhedral compound

Compound of six decagrammic prisms
Type	Uniform compound
Index	UC_{41}
Polyhedra	6 decagrammic prisms
Faces	12 decagrams, 60 squares
Edges	180
Vertices	120
Symmetry group	icosahedral (I_{h})
Subgroup restricting to one constituent	5-fold antiprismatic (D_{5d})

This uniform polyhedron compound is a symmetric arrangement of 6 decagrammic prisms, aligned with the axes of fivefold rotational symmetry of a dodecahedron.

== Cartesian coordinates ==
Cartesian coordinates for the vertices of this compound are all the cyclic permutations of

(±√(τ/√5), ±2τ^{−1}, ±√(τ^{−1}/√5))
(±(√(τ/√5)+τ^{−2}), ±1, ±(√(τ^{−1}/√5)−τ^{−1}))
(±(√(τ/√5)−τ^{−1}), ±τ^{−2}, ±(√(τ^{−1}/√5)+1))
(±(√(τ/√5)+τ^{−1}), ±τ^{−2}, ±(√(τ^{−1}/√5)−1))
(±(√(τ/√5)−τ^{−2}), ±1, ±(√(τ^{−1}/√5)+τ^{−1}))

where τ = (1+√5)/2 is the golden ratio (sometimes written φ).
