= Compound of two great retrosnub icosidodecahedra =

Polyhedral compound

Compound of two great retrosnub icosidodecahedra
| Type | Uniform compound |
| Index | UC_{72} |
| Polyhedra | 2 great retrosnub icosidodecahedra |
| Faces | 40+120 triangles, 24 pentagrams |
| Edges | 300 |
| Vertices | 120 |
| Symmetry group | icosahedral (I_{h}) |
| Subgroup restricting to one constituent | chiral icosahedral (I) |

3D model of a compound of two great retrosnub icosidodecahedra

The compound of two great retrosnub icosidodecahedra is a uniform polyhedron compound. It's composed of the 2 enantiomers of the great retrosnub icosidodecahedron.
