= Compound of two inverted snub dodecadodecahedra =

Polyhedral compound

Compound of two inverted snub dodecadodecahedra
| Type | Uniform compound |
| Index | UC_{74} |
| Polyhedra | 2 inverted snub dodecadodecahedra |
| Faces | 120 triangles, 24 pentagons, 24 pentagrams |
| Edges | 300 |
| Vertices | 120 |
| Symmetry group | icosahedral (I_{h}) |
| Subgroup restricting to one constituent | chiral icosahedral (I) |

3D model of the compound of two inverted snub dodecadodecahedra

The compound of two inverted snub dodecadodecahedra is a uniform polyhedron compound. It's composed of the 2 enantiomers of the inverted snub dodecadodecahedron.
