= Compound of five truncated tetrahedra =

Polyhedral compound

Compound of five truncated tetrahedra
Type	Uniform compound
Index	UC_{55}
Polyhedra	5 truncated tetrahedra
Faces	20 triangles, 20 hexagons
Edges	90
Vertices	60
Dual	Compound of five triakis tetrahedra
Symmetry group	chiral icosahedral (I)
Subgroup restricting to one constituent	chiral tetrahedral (T)

3D model of a compound of five truncated tetrahedra

The compound of five truncated tetrahedra is a uniform polyhedron compound. It's composed of 5 truncated tetrahedra rotated around a common axis. It may be formed by truncating each of the tetrahedra in the compound of five tetrahedra. A far-enough truncation creates the compound of five octahedra. Its convex hull is a nonuniform snub dodecahedron. It could also be called a truncated chiricosahedron.

== Cartesian coordinates ==
Cartesian coordinates for the vertices of this compound are all the cyclic permutations of

(±1, ±1, ±3)
(±τ^{−1}, ±(−τ^{−2}), ±2τ)
(±τ, ±(−2τ^{−1}), ±τ^{2})
(±τ^{2}, ±(−τ^{−2}), ±2)
(±(2τ−1), ±1, ±(2τ − 1))

with an even number of minuses in the choices for '±', where τ = (1+√5)/2 is the golden ratio (sometimes written φ).
