= Compound of two truncated tetrahedra =

Polyhedral compound

Compound of two truncated tetrahedra
Type	Uniform compound
Index	UC_{54}
Schläfli symbol	a_{2}{4,3}
Coxeter diagram	+ =
Polyhedra	2 truncated tetrahedra
Faces	8 triangles 8 hexagons
Edges	36
Vertices	24
Symmetry group	octahedral (O_{h}) [4,3]
Subgroup restricting to one constituent	tetrahedral (T_{d}) [3,3]

This uniform polyhedron compound is a composition of two truncated tetrahedra, formed by truncating each of the tetrahedra in the stellated octahedron. It is related to the cantic cube construction of the truncated tetrahedron, as, which is one of the two dual positions represented in this compound.

The vertex arrangement is the same as a convex, but nonuniform rhombicuboctahedron having 12 rectangular faces.
