= Compound of two snub dodecadodecahedra =

Polyhedral compound

Compound of two snub dodecadodecahedra
Type	Uniform compound
Index	UC_{73}
Polyhedra	2 snub dodecadodecahedra
Faces	120 triangles, 24 pentagons, 24 pentagrams
Edges	300
Vertices	120
Symmetry group	icosahedral (I_{h})
Subgroup restricting to one constituent	chiral icosahedral (I)

This uniform polyhedron compound is a composition of the 2 enantiomers of the snub dodecadodecahedron.
