= Compound of two great snub icosidodecahedra =

Polyhedral compound

Compound of two great snub icosidodecahedra
Type	Uniform compound
Index	UC_{70}
Polyhedra	2 great snub icosidodecahedra
Faces	40+120 triangles, 24 pentagrams
Edges	300
Vertices	120
Symmetry group	icosahedral (I_{h})
Subgroup restricting to one constituent	chiral icosahedral (I)

This uniform polyhedron compound is a composition of the 2 enantiomers of the great snub icosidodecahedron.
