= Compound of ten hexagonal prisms =

Polyhedral compound

Compound of ten hexagonal prisms
Type	Uniform compound
Index	UC_{39}
Polyhedra	10 hexagonal prisms
Faces	20 hexagons, 60 squares
Edges	180
Vertices	120
Symmetry group	icosahedral (I_{h})
Subgroup restricting to one constituent	3-fold antiprismatic (D_{3d})

This uniform polyhedron compound is a symmetric arrangement of 10 hexagonal prisms, aligned with the axes of three-fold rotational symmetry of an icosahedron.

== Cartesian coordinates ==
Cartesian coordinates for the vertices of this compound are all the cyclic permutations of

(±√3, ±(τ^{−1}−τ√3), ±(τ+τ^{−1}√3))
(±2√3, ±τ^{−1}, ±τ)
(±(1+√3), ±(1−τ√3), ±(1+τ^{−1}√3))
(±(τ−τ^{−1}√3), ±√3, ±(τ^{−1}+τ√3))
(±(1−τ^{−1}√3), ±(1−√3), ±(1+τ√3))

where τ = (1+√5)/2 is the golden ratio (sometimes written φ).
