= Cubic group =

Cubic group can mean:

- The octahedral symmetry group — one of the first 5 groups of the 7 point groups which are not in one of the 7 infinite series
- cubic space group
