= Compound of two snub icosidodecadodecahedra =

Polyhedral compound

Compound of two snub icosidodecadodecahedra
Type	Uniform compound
Index	UC_{75}
Polyhedra	2 snub icosidodecadodecahedra
Faces	40+120 triangles, 24 pentagons, 24 pentagrams
Edges	360
Vertices	120
Symmetry group	icosahedral (I_{h})
Subgroup restricting to one constituent	chiral icosahedral (I)

3D model of the compound of two snub icosidodecahedra

The compound of two snub icosidodecadodecahedra is a uniform polyhedron compound, composed of the 2 enantiomers of the snub icosidodecadodecahedron. Its convex hull is a nonuniform truncated icosidodecahedron.
