= Compound of six decagonal prisms =

Polyhedral compound

Compound of six decagonal prisms
Type	Uniform compound
Index	UC_{40}
Polyhedra	6 decagonal prisms
Faces	12 decagons, 60 squares
Edges	180
Vertices	120
Symmetry group	icosahedral (I_{h})
Subgroup restricting to one constituent	5-fold antiprismatic (D_{5d})

This uniform polyhedron compound is a symmetric arrangement of 6 decagonal prisms, aligned with the axes of fivefold rotational symmetry of a dodecahedron.

== Cartesian coordinates ==
Cartesian coordinates for the vertices of this compound are all the cyclic permutations of

(±√(τ^{−1}/√5), ±2τ, ±√(τ/√5))
(±(√(τ^{−1}/√5)−τ^{2}), ±1, ±(√(τ/√5)+τ))
(±(√(τ^{−1}/√5)−τ), ±τ^{2}, ±(√(τ/√5)+1))
(±(√(τ^{−1}/√5)+τ), ±τ^{2}, ±(√(τ/√5)−1))
(±(√(τ^{−1}/√5)+τ^{2}), ±1, ±(√(τ/√5)−τ))

where τ = (1+√5)/2 is the golden ratio (sometimes written φ).
