= Compound of three tetrahedra =

Polyhedral compound

Compound of 3 digonal antiprisms
Type	Uniform compound
Uniform index	UC_{23} (n=3, p=2, q=1)
Polyhedra	3 digonal antiprisms (tetrahedra)
Faces	12 triangles
Edges	24
Vertices	12
Symmetry group	D_{6d}, order 12
Subgroup restricting to one constituent	D_{2d}, order 4

In geometry, a compound of three tetrahedra can be constructed by three tetrahedra rotated by 60 degree turns along an axis of the middle of an edge. It has dihedral symmetry, D_{3d}, order 12. It is a uniform prismatic compound of antiprisms, UC23.

It is similar to the compound of two tetrahedra with 90 degree turns. It has the same vertex arrangement as the convex hexagonal antiprism.

== Related polytopes ==
A subset of edges of this compound polyhedron can generate a compound regular skew polygon, with 3 skew squares. Each tetrahedron contains one skew square. This regular compound polygon containing the same symmetry as the uniform polyhedral compound.

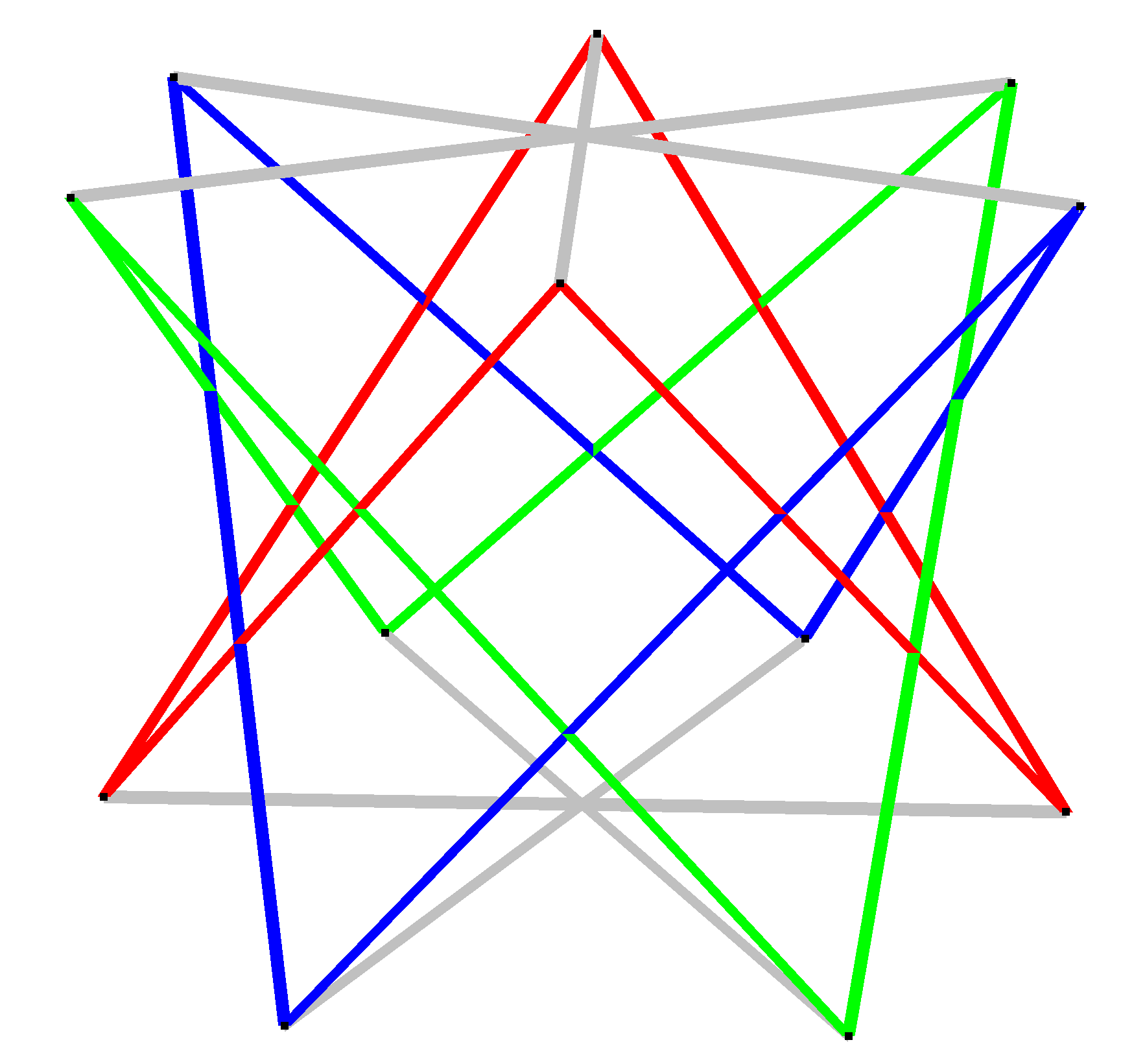
