= Compound of twenty octahedra with rotational freedom =

Polyhedral compound

Compound of twenty octahedra with rotational freedom
Type	Uniform compound
Index	UC_{13}
Polyhedra	20 octahedra
Faces	40+120 triangles
Edges	240
Vertices	120
Symmetry group	icosahedral (I_{h})
Subgroup restricting to one constituent	6-fold improper rotation (S_{6})

The compound of twenty octahedra with rotational freedom is a uniform polyhedron compound. It's composed of a symmetric arrangement of 20 octahedra, considered as triangular antiprisms. It can be constructed by superimposing two copies of the compound of 10 octahedra UC_{16}, and for each resulting pair of octahedra, rotating each octahedron in the pair by an equal and opposite angle θ.

When θ is zero or 60 degrees, the octahedra coincide in pairs yielding (two superimposed copies of) the compounds of ten octahedra UC_{16} and UC_{15} respectively. When

$$\theta=2\tan^{-1}\left(\sqrt{\frac{1}{3}\left(13-4\sqrt{10}\right)}\right)\approx 37.76124^\circ,$$

octahedra (from distinct rotational axes) coincide in sets four, yielding the compound of five octahedra. When

$$\theta=2\tan^{-1}\left(\frac{-4\sqrt{3}-2\sqrt{15}+\sqrt{132+60\sqrt{5}}}{4+\sqrt{2}+2\sqrt{5}+\sqrt{10}}\right)\approx14.33033^\circ,$$

the vertices coincide in pairs, yielding the compound of twenty octahedra (without rotational freedom).

== Cartesian coordinates ==
Cartesian coordinates for the vertices of this compound are all the cyclic permutations of

$$\begin{align}
& \scriptstyle \Big( \pm2\sqrt3\sin\theta,\, \pm(\tau^{-1}\sqrt2+2\tau\cos\theta),\, \pm(\tau\sqrt2-2\tau^{-1}\cos\theta) \Big) \\
& \scriptstyle \Big( \pm(\sqrt2 -\tau^2\cos\theta + \tau^{-1}\sqrt3\sin\theta),\, \pm(\sqrt2 + (2\tau-1)\cos\theta + \sqrt3\sin\theta),\, \pm(\sqrt2 + \tau^{-2}\cos\theta - \tau\sqrt3\sin\theta) \Big) \\
& \scriptstyle \Big(\pm(\tau^{-1}\sqrt2-\tau\cos\theta-\tau\sqrt3\sin\theta),\, \pm(\tau\sqrt2 + \tau^{-1}\cos\theta+\tau^{-1}\sqrt3\sin\theta),\, \pm(3\cos\theta-\sqrt3\sin\theta) \Big) \\
& \scriptstyle \Big(\pm(-\tau^{-1}\sqrt2 + \tau\cos\theta - \tau\sqrt 3\sin\theta),\, \pm(\tau\sqrt2 + \tau^{-1}\cos\theta-\tau^{-1}\sqrt3\sin\theta),\, \pm(3\cos\theta+\sqrt3\sin\theta) \Big) \\
& \scriptstyle \Big(\pm(-\sqrt 2 + \tau^2\cos\theta+\tau^{-1}\sqrt 3 \sin\theta), \, \pm(\sqrt 2 + (2\tau-1)\cos\theta - \sqrt 3 \sin\theta), \, \pm(\sqrt 2 + \tau^{-2}\cos\theta + \tau\sqrt 3 \sin\theta) \Big)
\end{align}$$

where τ = (1 + √5)/2 is the golden ratio (sometimes written φ).

== Gallery ==
Compounds of twenty octahedra with rotational freedom

θ = 0°

θ = 5°

θ = 10°

θ = 15°

θ = 20°

θ = 25°

θ = 30°

θ = 35°

θ = 40°

θ = 45°

θ = 50°

θ = 55°

θ = 60°
