= Compound of five rhombicuboctahedra =

Polyhedral compound

Compound of five rhombicuboctahedra
Type	Uniform compound
Index	UC_{62}
Polyhedra	5 rhombicuboctahedra
Faces	40 triangles, 30+60 squares
Edges	240
Vertices	120
Symmetry group	icosahedral (I_{h})
Subgroup restricting to one constituent	pyritohedral (T_{h})

This uniform polyhedron compound is a composition of 5 rhombicuboctahedra, in the same vertex arrangement (i.e. sharing vertices with) the compound of 5 stellated truncated hexahedra.
