= Prismatic compound of prisms =

Polyhedral compound

Compound of n p/q-gonal prisms
(n=2, p=5, q=2)
| Type | Uniform compound |
| Index | UC_{21} |
| Polyhedra | n p/q-gonal prisms |
| Faces | 2n {p/q}, np squares |
| Edges | 3np |
| Vertices | 2np |
| Symmetry group | np-fold prismatic (D_{nph}) |
| Subgroup restricting to one constituent | p-fold prismatic (D_{ph}) |

Each member of this infinite family of uniform polyhedron compounds is a symmetric arrangement of prisms sharing a common axis of rotational symmetry.

This infinite family can be enumerated as follows:

- For each positive integer n≥1 and for each rational number p/q>2 (expressed with p and q coprime), there occurs the compound of n p/q-gonal prisms, with symmetry group D_{nph}.
