= Compound of five stellated truncated hexahedra =

Polyhedral compound

Compound of five stellated truncated hexahedra
Type	Uniform compound
Index	UC_{58}
Polyhedra	5 stellated truncated hexahedra
Faces	40 triangles, 30 octagrams
Edges	180
Vertices	120
Symmetry group	icosahedral (I_{h})
Subgroup restricting to one constituent	pyritohedral (T_{h})

This uniform polyhedron compound is a composition of 5 stellated truncated hexahedra, formed by star-truncating each of the cubes in the compound of 5 cubes.

== Cartesian coordinates ==
Cartesian coordinates for the vertices of this compound are all the cyclic permutations of

(±(2−√2), ±√2, ±(2−√2))
(±φ, ±(φ^{−1}−φ^{−1}√2), ±(2φ−1−φ√2))
(±1, ±(φ^{−2}+φ^{−1}√2), ±(φ^{2}−φ√2))
(±(1−√2), ±(−φ^{−2}+√2), ±(φ^{2}−√2))
(±(φ−φ√2), ±(−φ^{−1}), ±(2φ−1−φ^{−1}√2))

where φ = (1+√5)/2 is the golden ratio.
