= Compound of five cuboctahedra =

Polyhedral compound

Compound of five cuboctahedra
| Type | Uniform compound |
| Index | UC_{59} |
| Polyhedra | 5 cuboctahedra |
| Faces | 40 triangles, 30 squares |
| Edges | 120 |
| Vertices | 60 |
| Symmetry group | icosahedral (I_{h}) |
| Subgroup restricting to one constituent | pyritohedral (T_{h}) |

In geometry, this uniform polyhedron compound is a composition of 5 cuboctahedra. It has icosahedral symmetry I_{h}. It could also be called the anticosicosahedron.

== Cartesian coordinates ==
Cartesian coordinates for the vertices of this compound are all the cyclic permutations of

(±2, 0, ±2)
(±τ, ±τ^{−1}, ±(2τ−1))
(±1, ±τ^{−2}, ±τ^{2})

where τ = (1+√5)/2 is the golden ratio (sometimes written φ).

== Construction ==
The compound of 5 cuboctahedra could be made by the rectification of the compound of five cubes or compound of five octahedra. It could also be formed by the expansion of the compound of five or ten tetrahedra.
