= Compound of five icosahedra =

Polyhedral compound

Compound of five icosahedra
Type	Uniform compound
Index	UC_{47}
Polyhedra	5 icosahedra
Faces	40+60 Triangles
Edges	150
Vertices	60
Symmetry group	icosahedral (I_{h})
Subgroup restricting to one constituent	pyritohedral (T_{h})

3D model of a compound of five icosahedra

The compound of five icosahedra is uniform polyhedron compound. It's composed of 5 icosahedra, rotated around a common axis. It has icosahedral symmetry I_{h}.

The triangles in this compound decompose into two orbits under action of the symmetry group: 40 of the triangles lie in coplanar pairs in icosahedral planes, while the other 60 lie in unique planes.

The compound of five icosahedra shares the same vertex arrangement of a nonuniform rhombicosidodecahedron.

== Cartesian coordinates ==
Cartesian coordinates for the vertices of this compound are all the cyclic permutations of

(0, ±2, ±2τ)
(±τ^{−1}, ±1, ±(1+τ^{2}))
(±τ, ±τ^{2}, ±(2τ−1))

where τ = (1+√5)/2 is the golden ratio (sometimes written φ).
