= Compound of six tetrahedra =

Polyhedral compound

Compound of six tetrahedra
Type	Uniform compound
Convex hull	Nonuniform truncated octahedron
Index	UC_{3}
Polyhedra	6 tetrahedra
Faces	24 triangles
Edges	36
Vertices	24
Symmetry group	octahedral (O_{h})
Subgroup restricting to one constituent	2-fold antiprismatic (D_{2d})

3D model of a compound of six tetrahedra

The compound of six tetrahedra is a uniform polyhedron compound. It's composed of a symmetric arrangement of 6 tetrahedra. It can be constructed by inscribing a stella octangula within each cube in the compound of three cubes, or by stellating each octahedron in the compound of three octahedra.

It is one of only five polyhedral compounds (along with the compound of two great dodecahedra, the compound of five great dodecahedra, the compound of two small stellated dodecahedra, and the compound of five small stellated dodecahedra) which is vertex-transitive and face-transitive but not edge-transitive.
