= Compound of five truncated cubes =

Polyhedral compound

Compound of five truncated cubes
Type	Uniform compound
Index	UC_{57}
Polyhedra	5 truncated cubes
Faces	40 triangles, 30 octagons
Edges	180
Vertices	120
Symmetry group	icosahedral (I_{h})
Subgroup restricting to one constituent	pyritohedral (T_{h})

This uniform polyhedron compound is a composition of 5 truncated cubes, formed by truncating each of the cubes in the compound of 5 cubes. It is also called the truncated rhombihedron.

== Cartesian coordinates ==
Cartesian coordinates for the vertices of this compound are all the cyclic permutations of

(±(2+√2), ±√2, ±(2+√2))
(±τ, ±(τ^{−1}+τ^{−1}√2), ±(2τ−1+τ√2))
(±1, ±(τ^{−2}−τ^{−1}√2), ±(τ^{2}+τ√2))
(±(1+√2), ±(−τ^{−2}−√2), ±(τ^{2}+√2))
(±(τ+τ√2), ±(−τ^{−1}), ±(2τ−1+τ^{−1}√2))

where τ = (1+√5)/2 is the golden ratio (sometimes written φ).
