= Compound of five tetrahedra =

Compound polyhedron

Compound of five tetrahedra
Type	Regular compound
Coxeter symbol	{5,3}[5{3,3}] {3,5}
Index	UC_{5}, W_{24}
Elements (As a compound)	5 tetrahedra: F = 20, E = 30, V = 20
Dual compound	Self-dual
Symmetry group	chiral icosahedral (I)
Subgroup restricting to one constituent	chiral tetrahedral (T)

3D model of a compound of five tetrahedra

The compound of five tetrahedra, also known as the chiricosahedron, is one of the five regular polyhedral compounds. This compound polyhedron is also a stellation of the regular icosahedron. It was first described by Edmund Hess in 1876.

It can be seen as a faceting of a regular dodecahedron.

== As a compound ==
It can be constructed by arranging five tetrahedra in rotational icosahedral symmetry (I), as colored in the upper right model. It is one of five regular compounds which can be constructed from identical Platonic solids.

It shares the same vertex arrangement as a regular dodecahedron.

There are two enantiomorphous forms (the same figure but having opposite chirality) of this compound polyhedron. Both forms together create the reflection symmetric compound of ten tetrahedra.

It has a density of higher than 1.

As a spherical tiling	Transparent Models (Animation)	Five interlocked tetrahedra

== As a stellation ==
It can also be obtained by stellating the icosahedron, and is given as Wenninger model index 24.

Stellation diagram	Stellation core	Convex hull
	Icosahedron	Dodecahedron

== As a faceting ==
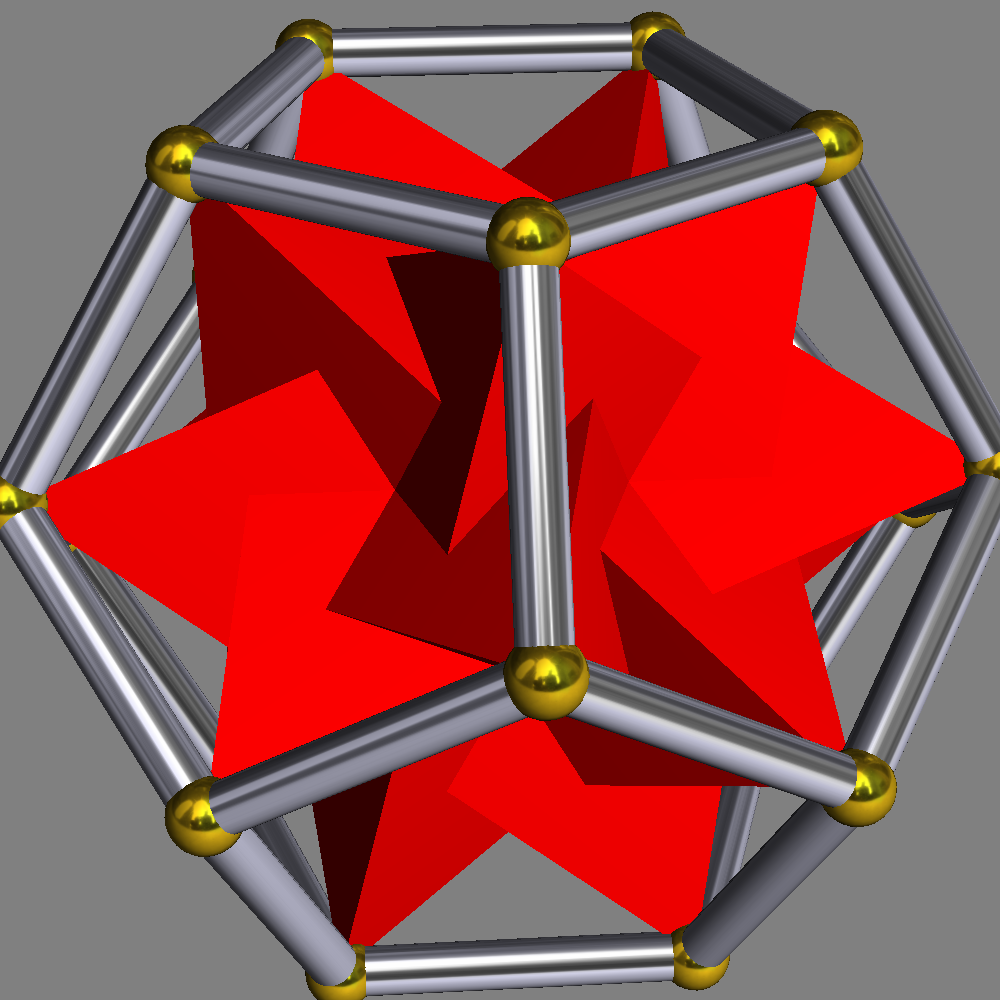
Five tetrahedra in a dodecahedron.

It is a faceting of a dodecahedron, as shown at left.

== Group theory ==
The compound of five tetrahedra is a geometric illustration of the notion of orbits and stabilizers, as follows.

The symmetry group of the compound is the (rotational) icosahedral group I of order 60, while the stabilizer of a single chosen tetrahedron is the (rotational) tetrahedral group T of order 12, and the orbit space I/T (of order 60/12 = 5) is naturally identified with the 5 tetrahedra – the coset gT corresponds to which tetrahedron g sends the chosen tetrahedron to.

== An unusual dual property ==
Compound of five tetrahedra

This compound is unusual, in that the dual figure is the enantiomorph of the original. If the faces are twisted to the right, then the vertices are twisted to the left. When we dualise, the faces dualise to right-twisted vertices and the vertices dualise to left-twisted faces, giving the chiral twin. Figures with this property are extremely rare.

== In 4-dimensional space ==
The compound of five tetrahedra is related to the regular 5-cell, the 4-simplex regular 4-polytope, which is also composed of 5 regular tetrahedra. In the 5-cell the tetrahedra are bonded face-to-face such that each triangular face is shared by two tetrahedral cells.

The compound of five tetrahedra occurs embedded in 4-dimensional space, inscribed in the 120 dodecahedral cells of the 120-cell. The 120-cell is the largest and most comprehensive regular 4-polytope; the regular 5-cell is the smallest and most elemental. The 120-cell contains inscribed within itself instances of every other regular 4-polytope. In each of the 120-cell's dodecahedral cells, there are two inscribed instances of the compound of 5 tetrahedra (in other words, one instance of the compound of ten tetrahedra). The 5 tetrahedra of each compound of five occur as cells of another regular 4-polytope inscribed within the 120-cell, the 600-cell, which has 600 regular tetrahedra as its cells. The 120-cell is a compound of 5 disjoint 600-cells, and each of its dodecahedral cells is a compound of 5 tetrahedral cells, one cell from each of the 5 disjoint 600-cells.

== See also ==
- Compound of ten tetrahedra
- Compound of five cubes
- Compound of five truncated tetrahedra

== Citations ==
Notable stellations of the icosahedron
Regular	Uniform duals			Regular compounds			Regular star	Others	
(Convex) icosahedron	Small triambic icosahedron	Medial triambic icosahedron	Great triambic icosahedron	Compound of five octahedra	Compound of five tetrahedra	Compound of ten tetrahedra	Great icosahedron	Excavated dodecahedron	Final stellation
The stellation process on the icosahedron creates a number of related polyhedra and compounds with icosahedral symmetry.
