= Prismatic compound of antiprisms =

Polyhedral compound

Compound of n p/q-gonal antiprisms
n=2: 5/3-gonal / 5/2-gonal
Type	Uniform compound
Index	q odd: UC_{23}; q even: UC_{25}
Polyhedra	n p/q-gonal antiprisms
Schläfli symbols (n=2)	ß{2,2p/q} ßr{2,p/q}
Coxeter diagrams (n=2)	
Faces	2n {p/q} (unless p/q=2), 2np triangles
Edges	4np
Vertices	2np
Symmetry group	nq odd: np-fold antiprismatic (D_{npd}); nq even: np-fold prismatic (D_{nph})
Subgroup restricting to one constituent	q odd: p-fold antiprismatic (D_{pd}); q even: p-fold prismatic (D_{ph})

In geometry, a prismatic compound of antiprism is a category of uniform polyhedron compound. Each member of this infinite family of uniform polyhedron compounds is a symmetric arrangement of antiprisms sharing a common axis of rotational symmetry.

== Infinite family ==
This infinite family can be enumerated as follows:

- For each positive integer n ≥ 1 and for each rational number p/q > 3/2 (expressed with p and q coprime), there occurs the compound of n p/q-gonal antiprisms, with symmetry group:
  - D_{npd} if nq is odd
  - D_{nph} if nq is even

When p/q = 2, or equivalently p = 2, q = 1, the component is the tetrahedron (or dyadic antiprism). In this case, if n = 2 then the compound is the stella octangula, with higher symmetry (O_{h}).

== Compounds of two antiprisms ==
Compounds of two n-antiprisms share their vertices with a 2n-prism, and exist as two alternated set of vertices.

Cartesian coordinates for the vertices of an antiprism with n-gonal bases and isosceles triangles are

- $\left( \cos\frac{k\pi}{n}, \sin\frac{k\pi}{n}, (-1)^k h \right)$
- $\left( \cos\frac{k\pi}{n}, \sin\frac{k\pi}{n}, (-1)^{k+1} h \right)$

with k ranging from 0 to 2n−1; if the triangles are equilateral,

$$2h^2=\cos\frac{\pi}{n}-\cos\frac{2\pi}{n}.$$

Compounds of 2 antiprisms
2 digonal antiprisms (tetrahedra)	2 triangular antiprisms (octahedra)	2 square antiprisms	2 hexagonal antiprisms	2 pentagrammic crossed antiprism

=== Compound of two trapezohedra (duals) ===
The duals of the prismatic compound of antiprisms are compounds of trapezohedra:

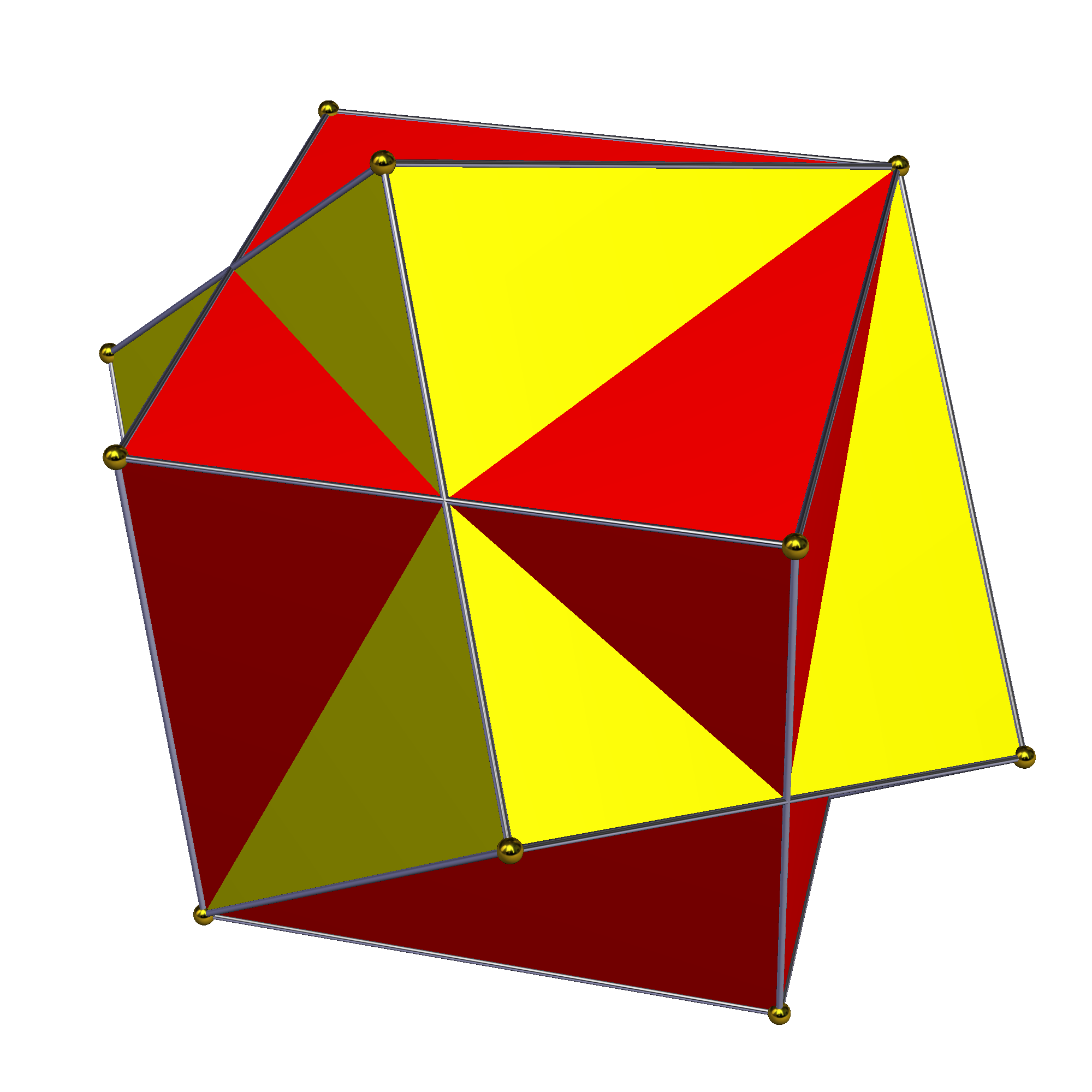
Two cubes
(trigonal trapezohedra)

== Compound of three antiprisms ==
For compounds of three digonal antiprisms, they are rotated 60 degrees, while three triangular antiprisms are rotated 40 degrees.

Three tetrahedra	Three octahedra
