= Cyclic symmetry in three dimensions =

In three dimensional geometry, there are four infinite series of point groups in three dimensions (n ≥ 1) with n-fold rotational or reflectional symmetry about one axis (by an angle of 360°/n) that does not change the object.

They are the finite symmetry groups on a cone. For n = ∞ they correspond to four frieze groups. Schönflies notation is used. The terms horizontal (h) and vertical (v) imply the existence and direction of reflections with respect to a vertical axis of symmetry. Also shown are Coxeter notation in brackets, and, in parentheses, orbifold notation.

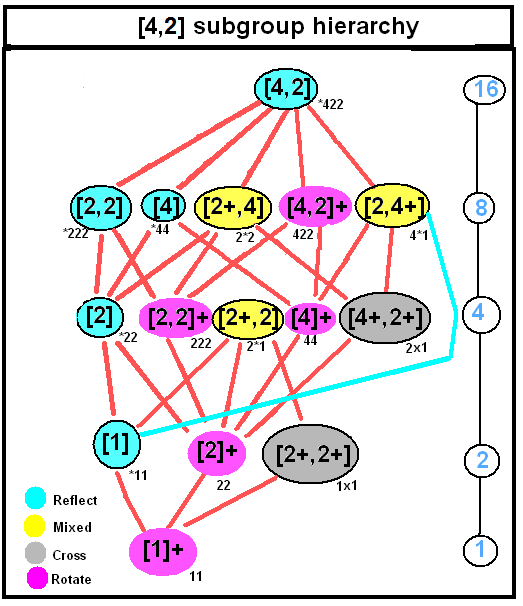
Subgroup tree for dihedral symmetry: D_{4h}, [4,2], (*224)

== Types ==
Chiral

- C_{n}, [n]^{+}, (nn) of order n - n-fold rotational symmetry - acro-n-gonal group (abstract group Z_{n}); for n = 1: no symmetry (trivial group)

Achiral

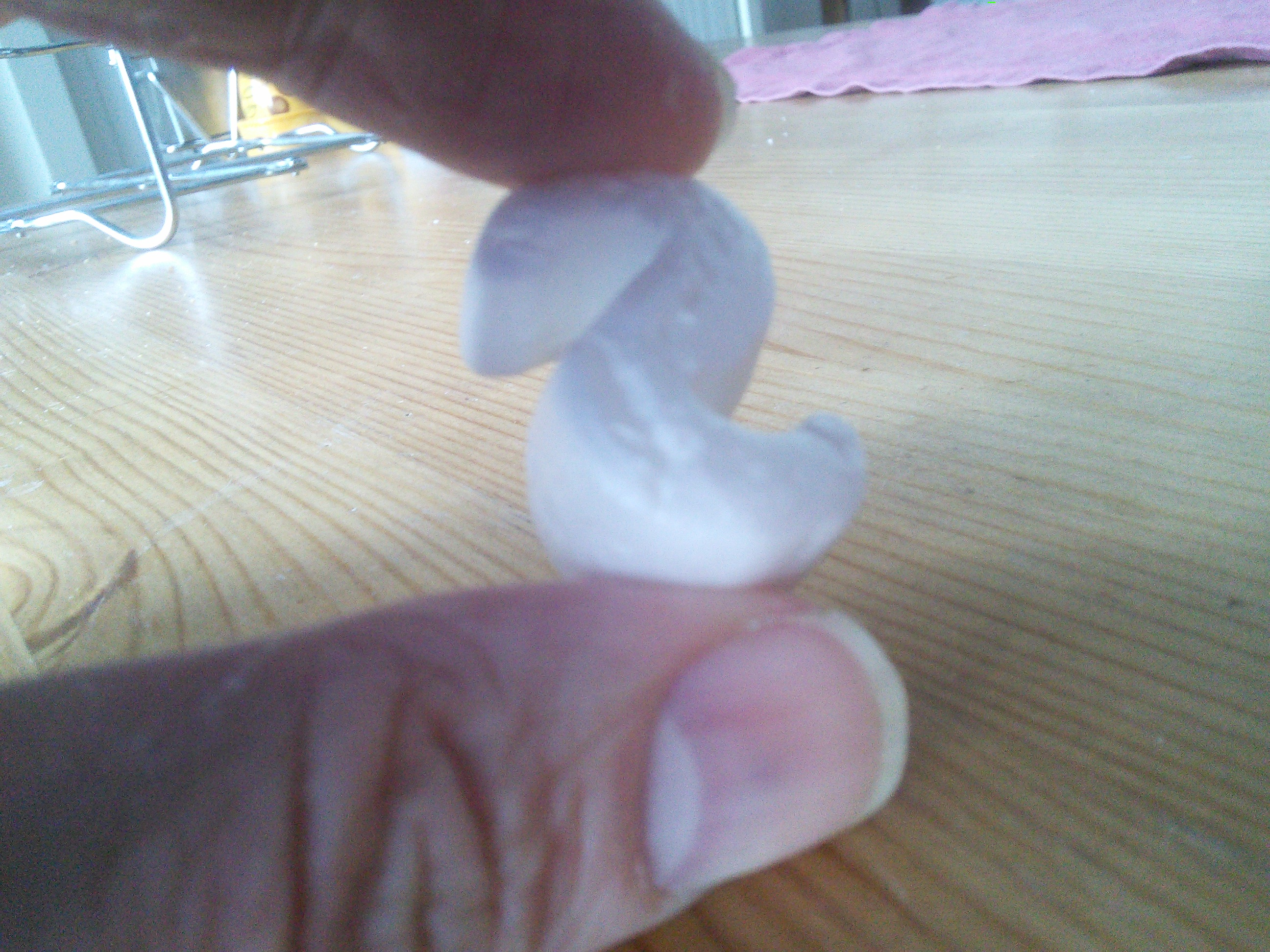
Piece of loose-fill cushioning with C_{2h} symmetry

- C_{nh}, [n^{+},2], (n*) of order 2n - prismatic symmetry or ortho-n-gonal group (abstract group Z_{n} × Dih_{1}); for n = 1 this is denoted by C_{s} (1*) and called reflection symmetry, also bilateral symmetry. It has reflection symmetry with respect to a plane perpendicular to the n-fold rotation axis.
- C_{nv}, [n], (*nn) of order 2n - pyramidal symmetry or full acro-n-gonal group (abstract group Dih_{n}); in biology C_{2v} is called biradial symmetry. For n = 1 we have again C_{s} (1*). It has vertical mirror planes. This is the symmetry group for a regular n-sided pyramid.
- S_{2n}, [2^{+},2n^{+}], (n×) of order 2n - gyro-n-gonal group (not to be confused with symmetric groups, for which the same notation is used; abstract group Z_{2n}); It has a 2n-fold rotoreflection axis, also called 2n-fold improper rotation axis, i.e., the symmetry group contains a combination of a reflection in the horizontal plane and a rotation by an angle 180°/n. Thus, like D_{nd}, it contains a number of improper rotations without containing the corresponding rotations.
  - for n = 1 we have S_{2} (1×), also denoted by C_{i}; this is inversion symmetry.

C_{2h}, [2,2^{+}] (2*) and C_{2v}, [2], (*22) of order 4 are two of the three 3D symmetry group types with the Klein four-group as abstract group. C_{2v} applies e.g. for a rectangular tile with its top side different from its bottom side.

== Frieze groups ==
In the limit these four groups represent Euclidean plane frieze groups as C_{∞}, C_{∞h}, C_{∞v}, and S_{∞}. Rotations become translations in the limit. Portions of the infinite plane can also be cut and connected into an infinite cylinder.

Frieze groups
Notations				Examples	
IUC	Orbifold	Coxeter	Schönflies^{*}	Euclidean plane	Cylindrical (n=6)
p1	∞∞	[∞]^{+}	C_{∞}		
p1m1	*∞∞	[∞]	C_{∞v}		
p11m	∞*	[∞^{+},2]	C_{∞h}		
p11g	∞×	[∞^{+},2^{+}]	S_{∞}		

== Examples ==
S_{2}/C_{i} (1x):	C_{4v} (*44):		C_{5v} (*55):
Parallelepiped	Square pyramid	Elongated square pyramid	Pentagonal pyramid

== See also ==
- Dihedral symmetry in three dimensions
