= Octahedral symmetry =

3D symmetry group

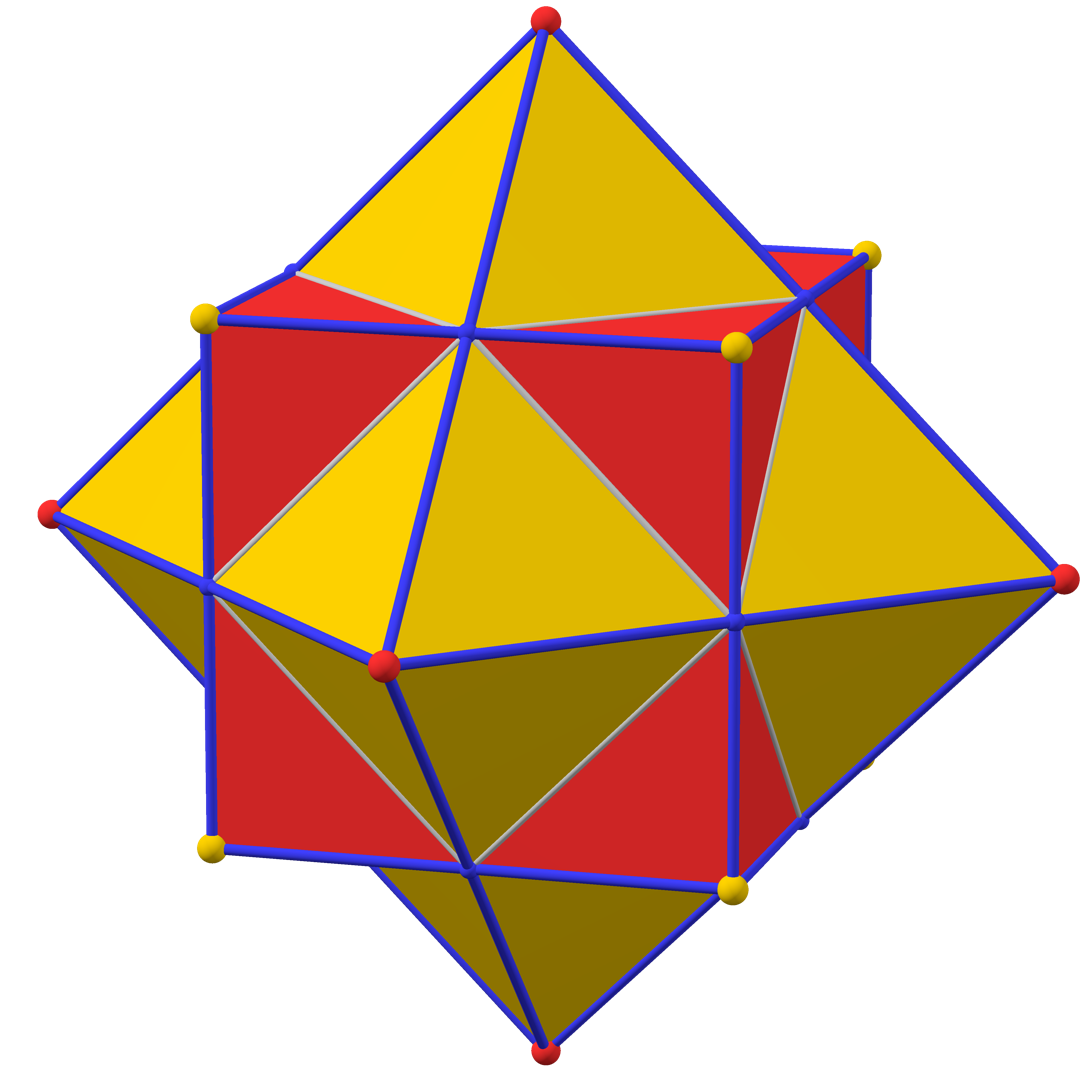
A cube and a regular octahedron, dual to each other, have the same 48 symmetries.

Octahedral symmetry is the symmetry of the cube and of the regular octahedron. Both solids have the same symmetries because they are dual to each other: the centers of the faces of a cube are the vertices of an octahedron, and vice versa.

A cube can be rotated in 24 ways (counting the identity) such that it looks the same as before. These rotations form the chiral octahedral group, denoted O in Schoenflies notation and 432 in Hermann–Mauguin notation. Their axes are of three kinds: 3 four-fold axes through the centers of opposite faces (rotations by 90°, 180°, 270°), 4 three-fold axes along the body diagonals, through opposite vertices (rotations by 120°, 240°), and 6 two-fold axes through the midpoints of opposite edges (rotations by 180°). Including reflections, the cube has 48 symmetries. They form the full (or achiral) octahedral group O_{h} (Hermann–Mauguin m3̅m). Each of them is a rotation from O, or such a rotation combined with the inversion through the center.

Every rotation of the cube permutes the four body diagonals, and each of the 24 permutations occurs exactly once. Therefore O is isomorphic to the symmetric group S_{4}, and O_{h} is isomorphic to S_{4} × C_{2}.

O_{h} is the largest point group compatible with translational symmetry. O and O_{h} are crystallographic point groups of the cubic crystal system.

Octahedral symmetry is one of the polyhedral symmetries among the point groups in three dimensions, along with tetrahedral symmetry and icosahedral symmetry.

== Chiral octahedral symmetry ==
Gyration axes
C_{4}	C_{3}	C_{2}
3	4	6

O, 432 (in Hermann–Mauguin and in orbifold notation), or [4,3]^{+} (in Coxeter notation) of order 24, is chiral octahedral symmetry or rotational octahedral symmetry, the rotation group of the cube and the regular octahedron. This group is like chiral tetrahedral symmetry T, but the C_{2} axes are now C_{4} axes, and additionally there are 6 C_{2} axes, through the midpoints of the edges of the cube. Each permutation of the four body diagonals of the cube is effected by exactly one rotation in O, hence O is isomorphic to the symmetric group S_{4}. T_{d} is isomorphic to O as an abstract group: it is the union of T and the set obtained by combining each element of O \ T with inversion.

Chiral octahedral symmetry
Orthogonal projection	Stereographic projection		
2-fold	4-fold	3-fold	2-fold

== Full octahedral symmetry ==
O_{h}, *432, [4,3], or m3̅m of order 48 – achiral octahedral symmetry or full octahedral symmetry. This group has the same rotation axes as O, but with mirror planes, comprising both the mirror planes of T_{d} and T_{h}. It is the full symmetry group of the cube and octahedron. Since the inversion commutes with all rotations, O_{h} is the direct product of O and the group generated by the inversion, and thus isomorphic to S_{4} × C_{2}. It is the hyperoctahedral group for n = 3.

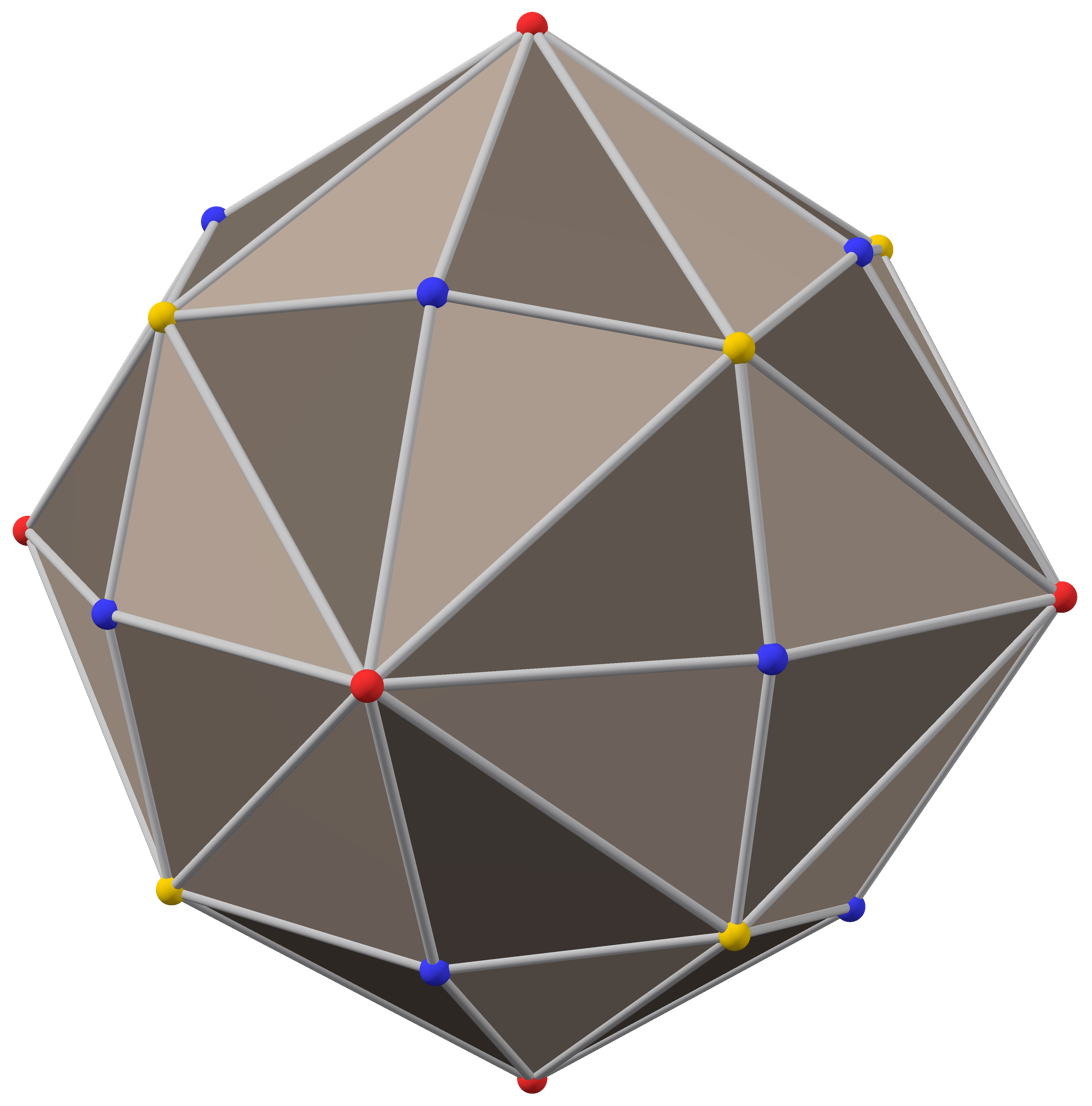
Each face of the disdyakis dodecahedron is a fundamental domain.

The octahedral group O_{h} with fundamental domain

With the 4-fold axes as coordinate axes, a fundamental domain of O_{h} is given by 0 ≤ x ≤ y ≤ z. An object with this symmetry is characterized by the part of the object in the fundamental domain, for example the cube is given by z = 1, and the octahedron by x + y + z = 1 (or the corresponding inequalities, to get the solid instead of the surface). ax + by + cz = 1 gives a polyhedron with 48 faces, e.g. the disdyakis dodecahedron.

Faces are 8-by-8 combined to larger faces for a = b = 0 (cube) and 6-by-6 for a = b = c (octahedron).

O_{h} has 9 mirror planes: the 3 planes perpendicular to the 4-fold axes (parallel to the faces of the cube), and the 6 planes perpendicular to the 2-fold axes (each containing two opposite edges of the cube). The reflections in the 3 planes generate the subgroup D_{2h}, those in the 6 planes generate the subgroup T_{d}. Adding to D_{2h} the 2 diagonal planes that contain one of the 4-fold axes gives D_{4h}.

Octahedral symmetry and reflective subgroups

Orthographic projection	Stereographic projection		
Orthographic projection	4-fold	3-fold	2-fold
O_{h}, [4,3],, full octahedral symmetry (3+6 mirrors)
T_{d}, [3,3]=[1^{+},4,3], =, tetrahedral subgroup (6 mirrors)
C_{3v}, [3],, dihedral subgroup (3 mirrors)

Orthographic projection	Stereographic projection		
Orthographic projection	4-fold	3-fold	2-fold
D_{4h}, [4,2], dihedral subgroup (1+2+2 mirrors)
D_{2h}, [2,2]=[4,3*], = dihedral subgroup (1+1+1 mirrors)
C_{4v}, [4],, dihedral subgroup (2+2 mirrors)

== Conjugacy classes ==
48 symmetry elements of a cube

Cycle graph of O_{h}. The four hexagonal cycles have the inversion (the black knot on top) in common.

The 24 rotations in O fall into five conjugacy classes. Combining the elements of each class with the inversion (x is mapped to −x) yields the other five conjugacy classes of O_{h}. The table also gives the permutations of the four body diagonals and the unit quaternion representation of the rotations.

Conjugacy classes of O_{h}
Elements of O	Number	Permutations of the body diagonals	Unit quaternions	Elements of O combined with inversion
identity	1	identity	1	inversion
rotation by 90° about a 4-fold axis (through the centers of opposite faces; 3 axes, 2 per axis)	6	(1 2 3 4), etc.	(1 ± i )/√2, etc.	rotoreflection by 90°
rotation by 180° about a 4-fold axis (3 axes, 1 per axis)	3	(1 2) (3 4), etc.	i, j, k	reflection in a plane perpendicular to a 4-fold axis
rotation by 180° about a 2-fold axis (through the midpoints of opposite edges; 6 axes, 1 per axis)	6	(1 2), etc.	(i ± j )/√2, etc.	reflection in a plane perpendicular to a 2-fold axis
rotation by 120° about a 3-fold axis (a body diagonal; 4 axes, 2 per axis)	8	(1 2 3), etc.	(1 ± i ± j ± k)/2	rotoreflection by 60°

A rotoreflection is a rotation combined with a reflection in the plane perpendicular to the rotation axis. A rotation by 180° combined with inversion is just the reflection in the plane perpendicular to the rotation axis. The combination of inversion and rotation about a body diagonal by 120° is rotation about the body diagonal by 60°, combined with reflection in the perpendicular plane (the rotation by 60° itself does not map the cube to itself; the intersection of the reflection plane with the cube is a regular hexagon).

Each rotation is represented by two unit quaternions ±q; the table lists one of them. The 48 unit quaternions obtained for all 24 rotations form the binary octahedral group (see binary polyhedral group).

A complete list of the 48 elements, with a numbering scheme, can be found in the Wikiversity article.

== Matrix representation ==
Take the set of all 3×3 permutation matrices and assign a + or − sign to each of the three 1s. There are $3!=6$ permutations and $2^3=8$ sign combinations for a total of 48 matrices, giving the full octahedral group. 24 of these matrices have a determinant of +1; these are the rotation matrices of the chiral octahedral group. The other 24 matrices have a determinant of −1 and correspond to a reflection or inversion.

Three reflectional generator matrices are needed for octahedral symmetry, which represent the three mirrors of a Coxeter–Dynkin diagram. The product of the reflections produce 3 rotational generators.

[4,3],
	Reflections			Rotations			Rotoreflection
Generators	R_{0}	R_{1}	R_{2}	R_{0}R_{1}	R_{1}R_{2}	R_{0}R_{2}	R_{0}R_{1}R_{2}
Group							
Order	2	2	2	4	3	2	6
Matrix	$\left [\begin{smallmatrix} 1 & \phantom{+}0 & \phantom{+}0 \\ 0 & \phantom{+}1 & \phantom{+}0 \\ 0 & \phantom{+}0 & -1 \\ \end{smallmatrix}\right ]$	$\left [\begin{smallmatrix} 1 & 0 & 0 \\ 0 & 0 & 1 \\ 0 & 1 & 0 \\ \end{smallmatrix}\right ]$	$\left [\begin{smallmatrix} 0 & 1 & 0 \\ 1 & 0 & 0 \\ 0 & 0 & 1 \\ \end{smallmatrix}\right ]$	$\left [\begin{smallmatrix} 1 & \phantom{+}0 & \phantom{+}0 \\ 0 & \phantom{+}0 & \phantom{+}1 \\ 0 & -1 & \phantom{+}0 \\ \end{smallmatrix}\right ]$	$\left [\begin{smallmatrix} 0 & 1 & 0 \\ 0 & 0 & 1 \\ 1 & 0 & 0 \\ \end{smallmatrix}\right ]$	$\left [\begin{smallmatrix} 0 & \phantom{+}1 & \phantom{+}0 \\ 1 & \phantom{+}0 & \phantom{+}0 \\ 0 & \phantom{+}0 & -1 \\ \end{smallmatrix}\right ]$	$\left [\begin{smallmatrix} \phantom{+}0 & 1 & 0 \\ \phantom{+}0 & 0 & 1 \\ -1 & 0 & 0 \\ \end{smallmatrix}\right ]$

== Subgroups of full octahedral symmetry ==
O

T_{d}

T_{h}

Cycle graphs of subgroups of order 24

Subgroups ordered in a Hasse diagram

Rotational subgroups

Reflective subgroups

Subgroups containing inversion

Schoenflies notation	Coxeter	Orb.	H-M	Structure	Cyc.	Order	Index
O_{h}	[4,3]	*432	m3̅m	S_{4}×S_{2}		48	1
T_{d}	[3,3]	*332	4̅3m	S_{4}		24	2
D_{4h}	[2,4]	*224	4/mmm	D_{2}×D_{8}		16	3
D_{2h}	[2,2]	*222	mmm	D^{3}_{2} = D_{2}×D_{4}		8	6
C_{4v}	[4]	*44	4mm	D_{8}		8	6
C_{3v}	[3]	*33	3m	D_{6} = S_{3}		6	8
C_{2v}	[2]	*22	mm2	D^{2}_{2} = D_{4}		4	12
C_{s} = C_{1v}	[ ]	*	2̅ or m	D_{2}		2	24
T_{h}	[3^{+},4]	3*2	m3̅	A_{4}×S_{2}		24	2
C_{4h}	[4^{+},2]	4*	4/m	Z_{4}×D_{2}		8	6
D_{3d}	[2^{+},6]	2*3	3̅m	D_{12} = Z_{2}×D_{6}		12	4
D_{2d}	[2^{+},4]	2*2	4̅2m	D_{8}		8	6
C_{2h} = D_{1d}	[2^{+},2]	2*	2/m	Z_{2}×D_{2}		4	12
S_{6}	[2^{+},6^{+}]	3×	3̅	Z_{6} = Z_{2}×Z_{3}		6	8
S_{4}	[2^{+},4^{+}]	2×	4̅	Z_{4}		4	12
S_{2}	[2^{+},2^{+}]	×	1̅	S_{2}		2	24
O	[4,3]^{+}	432	432	S_{4}		24	2
T	[3,3]^{+}	332	23	A_{4}		12	4
D_{4}	[2,4]^{+}	224	422	D_{8}		8	6
D_{3}	[2,3]^{+}	223	32	D_{6} = S_{3}		6	8
D_{2}	[2,2]^{+}	222	222	D_{4} = Z^{2}_{2}		4	12
C_{4}	[4]^{+}	44	4	Z_{4}		4	12
C_{3}	[3]^{+}	33	3	Z_{3} = A_{3}		3	16
C_{2}	[2]^{+}	22	2	Z_{2}		2	24
C_{1}	[ ]^{+}	11	1	Z_{1}		1	48

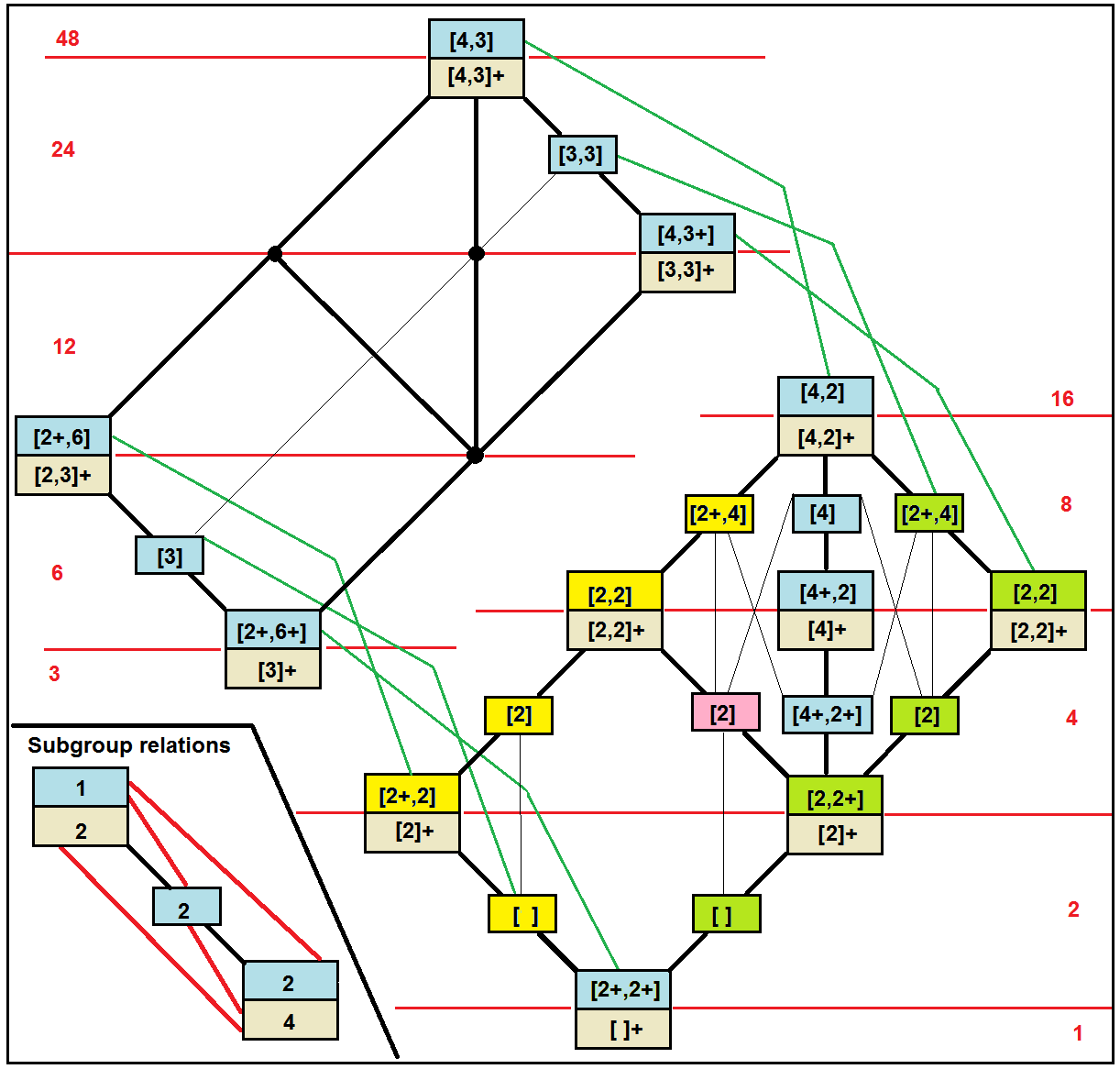
Octahedral subgroups in Coxeter notation

== Colored cubes ==
An isometry of the cube can be identified in various ways:

- by the images of three given mutually adjacent faces (say 1, 2, and 3 on a die)
- by the image of a cube with on one face a non-symmetric marking: the face with the marking, whether it is normal or a mirror image, and the orientation
- by a permutation of the four body diagonals, combined with a toggle for inversion of the cube, or not

For cubes with colors or markings (like dice have), the symmetry group is a subgroup of O_{h}.

Examples:

- C_{4v}, [4], (*44): if one face has a different color (or two opposite faces have colors different from each other and from the other four), the cube has 8 isometries, like a square has in 2D.
- D_{2h}, [2,2], (*222): if opposite faces have the same colors, different for each set of two, the cube has 8 isometries, like a cuboid.
- D_{4h}, [4,2], (*422): if two opposite faces have the same color, and all other faces have one different color, the cube has 16 isometries, like a square prism (square box).
- C_{2v}, [2], (*22):
  - if two adjacent faces have the same color, and all other faces have one different color, the cube has 4 isometries.
  - if three faces, of which two opposite to each other, have one color and the other three one other color, the cube has 4 isometries.
  - if two opposite faces have the same color, and two other opposite faces also, and the last two have different colors, the cube has 4 isometries.
- C_{s}, [ ], (*):
  - if two adjacent faces have colors different from each other, and the other four have a third color, the cube has 2 isometries.
  - if two opposite faces have the same color, and all other faces have different colors, the cube has 2 isometries.
- C_{3v}, [3], (*33): if three faces, of which none opposite to each other, have one color and the other three one other color, the cube has 6 isometries.

For other subgroups a cube with that group as symmetry group is not possible with just coloring whole faces. One has to draw some pattern on the faces.

Examples:

- D_{2d}, [2^{+},4], (2*2): if one face has a line segment dividing the face into two equal rectangles, and the opposite face has the same in perpendicular direction, the cube has 8 isometries.
- T_{h}, [3^{+},4], (3*2): if each face has a line segment dividing the face into two equal rectangles, such that the line segments of adjacent faces do not meet at the edge, the cube has 24 isometries: the even permutations of the body diagonals and the same combined with inversion.
- T_{d}, [3,3], (*332): if the cube consists of eight smaller cubes, four white and four black, put together alternatingly in all three standard directions, the cube has again 24 isometries: this time the even permutations of the body diagonals and the other proper rotations combined with inversion.
- T, [3,3]^{+}, (332): if each face has the same pattern with 2-fold rotational symmetry, say the letter S, such that at all edges a top of one S meets a side of the other S, the cube has 12 isometries: the even permutations of the body diagonals.

The full symmetry of the cube, O_{h}, [4,3], (*432), is preserved if and only if all faces have the same pattern such that the full symmetry of the square is preserved, with for the square a symmetry group, Dih_{4}, [4], of order 8.

The full symmetry of the cube under proper rotations, O, [4,3]^{+}, (432), is preserved if and only if all faces have the same pattern with 4-fold rotational symmetry, Z_{4}, [4]^{+}.

== Solids with octahedral chiral symmetry ==
Class	Name	Picture	Faces	Edges	Vertices	Dual name	Picture
Archimedean solid (dual Catalan solid)	snub cube		38	60	24	pentagonal icositetrahedron	

== Solids with full octahedral symmetry ==
Class	Name	Picture	Faces	Edges	Vertices	Dual name	Picture
Platonic solid	Cube	Hexahedron (cube)	6	12	8	Octahedron	Octahedron
Archimedean solid (dual Catalan solid)	Cuboctahedron		14	24	12	Rhombic dodecahedron	
Archimedean solid (dual Catalan solid)	Truncated cube		14	36	24	Triakis octahedron	
Archimedean solid (dual Catalan solid)	Truncated octahedron		14	36	24	Tetrakis hexahedron	
Archimedean solid (dual Catalan solid)	Rhombicuboctahedron		26	48	24	Deltoidal icositetrahedron	
Archimedean solid (dual Catalan solid)	Truncated cuboctahedron		26	72	48	Disdyakis dodecahedron	
Compound polyhedron	Stellated octahedron		8	12	8	Self-dual	
Compound polyhedron	Cube and octahedron		14	24	14	Self-dual	

== Octahedral symmetry of the Bolza surface ==
In Riemann surface theory, the Bolza surface is the double cover of the Riemann sphere ramified at the six vertices of an inscribed regular octahedron. The quotient of its group of 48 conformal automorphisms by the order-2 subgroup generated by the hyperelliptic involution, which swaps the two sheets of the cover, is the rotation group O of the octahedron.
