= Dihedral symmetry in three dimensions =

Regular polygonal symmetry

In geometry, dihedral symmetry in three dimensions is one of three infinite sequences of point groups in three dimensions which have a symmetry group that as an abstract group is a dihedral group Dih_{n} (for n ≥ 2).

== Types ==
There are 3 types of dihedral symmetry in three dimensions, each shown below in 3 notations: Schönflies notation, Coxeter notation, and orbifold notation.

Chiral

- D_{n}, [n,2]^{+}, (22n) of order 2n – dihedral symmetry or para-n-gonal group (abstract group: Dih_{n}).

Achiral

- D_{nh}, [n,2], (*22n) of order 4n – prismatic symmetry or full ortho-n-gonal group (abstract group: Dih_{n} × Z_{2}).
- D_{nd} (or D_{nv}), [2n,2^{+}], (2*n) of order 4n – antiprismatic symmetry or full gyro-n-gonal group (abstract group: Dih_{2n}).

For a given n, all three have n-fold rotational symmetry about one axis (rotation by an angle of 360°/n does not change the object), and 2-fold rotational symmetry about a perpendicular axis, hence about n of those. For n = ∞, they correspond to three Frieze groups. Schönflies notation is used, with Coxeter notation in brackets, and orbifold notation in parentheses. The term horizontal (h) is used with respect to a vertical axis of rotation.

In 2D, the symmetry group D_{n} includes reflections in lines. When the 2D plane is embedded horizontally in a 3D space, such a reflection can either be viewed as the restriction to that plane of a reflection through a vertical plane, or as the restriction to the plane of a rotation about the reflection line, by 180°. In 3D, the two operations are distinguished: the group D_{n} contains rotations only, not reflections. The other group is pyramidal symmetry C_{nv} of the same order, 2n.

With reflection symmetry in a plane perpendicular to the n-fold rotation axis, we have D_{nh}, [n], (*22n).

D_{nd} (or D_{nv}), [2n,2^{+}], (2*n) has vertical mirror planes between the horizontal rotation axes, not through them. As a result, the vertical axis is a 2n-fold rotoreflection axis.

D_{nh} is the symmetry group for a regular n-sided prism and also for a regular 2n-sided bipyramid. D_{nd} is the symmetry group for a regular n-gonal antiprism, and also for a regular n-gonal trapezohedron. D_{n} is the symmetry group of an n-gonal twisted prism and n-gonal twisted trapezohedron.

n = 1 is not included because the three symmetries are equal to other ones:

- D_{1} and C_{2}: group of order 2 with a single 180° rotation.
- D_{1h} and C_{2v}: group of order 4 with a reflection in a plane and a 180° rotation about a line in that plane.
- D_{1d} and C_{2h}: group of order 4 with a reflection in a plane and a 180° rotation about a line perpendicular to that plane.

For n = 2 there is not one main axis and two additional axes, but there are three equivalent ones.

- D_{2}, [2,2]^{+}, (222) of order 4 is one of the three symmetry group types with the Klein four-group as abstract group. It has three perpendicular 2-fold rotation axes. It is the symmetry group of a cuboid with an S written on two opposite faces, in the same orientation.
- D_{2h}, [2,2], (*222) of order 8 is the symmetry group of a cuboid.
- D_{2d}, [4,2^{+}], (2*2) of order 8 is the symmetry group of e.g.:
  - A square cuboid with a diagonal drawn on one square face, and a perpendicular diagonal on the other one.
  - A regular tetrahedron scaled in the direction of a line connecting the midpoints of two opposite edges (D_{2d} is a subgroup of T_{d}; by scaling, we reduce the symmetry).

== Subgroups ==
D_{2h}, [2,2], (*222)	D_{4h}, [4,2], (*224)

For D_{nh}, [n,2], (*22n), order 4n

- C_{nh}, [n^{+},2], (n*), order 2n
- C_{nv}, [n,1], (*nn), order 2n
- D_{n}, [n,2]^{+}, (22n), order 2n

For D_{nd}, [2n,2^{+}], (2*n), order 4n

- S_{2n}, [2n^{+},2^{+}], (n×), order 2n
- C_{nv}, [n^{+},2], (n*), order 2n
- D_{n}, [n,2]^{+}, (22n), order 2n

D_{nd} is also subgroup of D_{2nh}.

== Examples ==
D_{2h}, [2,2], (*222) Order 8	D_{2d}, [4,2^{+}], (2*2) Order 8	D_{3h}, [3,2], (*223) Order 12
Basketball seam paths	Baseball seam paths (ignoring directionality of seam)	Beach ball (ignoring colors)

D_{nh}, [2,n], (*22n):

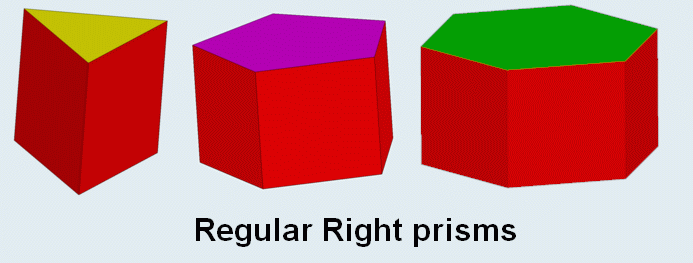
Prisms

D_{5h}, [2,5], (*225):

Pentagrammic prism	Pentagrammic antiprism

D_{4d}, [8,2^{+}], (2*4):

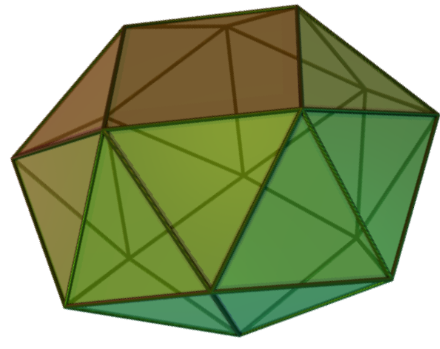
Snub square antiprism

D_{5d}, [10,2^{+}], (2*5):

Pentagonal antiprism	Pentagrammic crossed-antiprism	Pentagonal trapezohedron

D_{17d}, [34,2^{+}], (2*17):

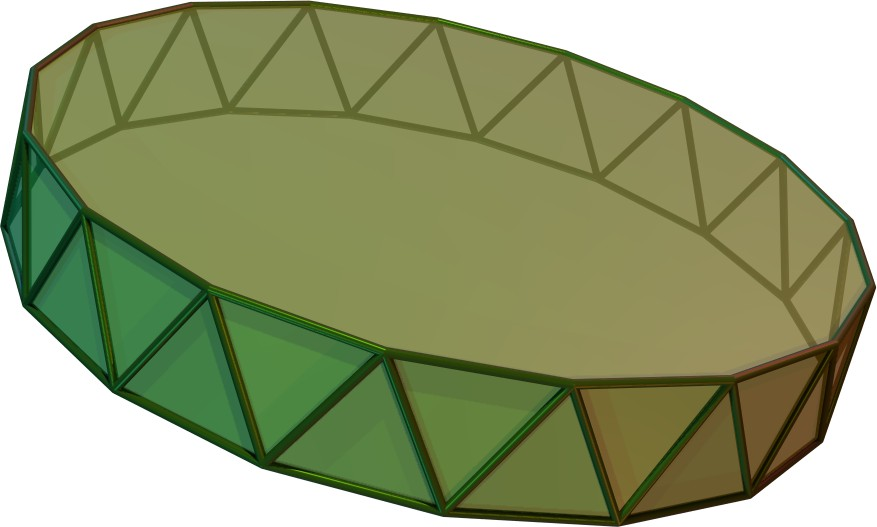
Heptadecagonal antiprism

== See also ==
- List of spherical symmetry groups
- Point groups in three dimensions
- Cyclic symmetry in three dimensions
