= Tetrahedral symmetry =

3D symmetry group

A regular tetrahedron, an example of a solid with full tetrahedral symmetry

Tetrahedral symmetry comprises three point groups that share the rotation axes of a regular tetrahedron: four 3-fold axes, each through a vertex and the center of the opposite face, and three 2-fold axes, each through the midpoints of two opposite edges.

The chiral tetrahedral group T consists of the 12 rotations: the identity, two rotations about each 3-fold axis, and a half-turn about each 2-fold axis. It is isomorphic to the alternating group A_{4} of even permutations of four objects. The full tetrahedral group T_{d} consists of all 24 symmetries of the regular tetrahedron, including mirror reflections. It is isomorphic to the symmetric group S_{4}, since there is exactly one symmetry for each permutation of the four vertices. An example is the methane molecule. The pyritohedral group T_{h}, also of order 24, consists of the rotations of T and their combinations with an inversion through the center. Examples are pyrite crystals and the seams of a volleyball.

All three groups are crystallographic point groups of the cubic crystal system. The symmetry groups of the cube and of the regular icosahedron are treated in octahedral symmetry and icosahedral symmetry.

== Details ==
In stereographic projection, the edges of the tetrakis hexahedron form six circles, which represent the six mirror planes of T_{d}; the 2-fold and 3-fold rotation axes pass through their intersections.

Stereographic projections
4-fold	3-fold	2-fold
Chiral tetrahedral symmetry, T, (332), [3,3]^{+} = [1^{+},4,3^{+}], =
Pyritohedral symmetry, T_{h}, (3*2), [4,3^{+}],
Achiral tetrahedral symmetry, T_{d}, (*332), [3,3] = [1^{+}4,3], =

== Chiral tetrahedral symmetry ==
The tetrahedral rotation group T with a fundamental domain; one face of the triakis tetrahedron is also a fundamental domain of T.	A tetrahedron can be placed in 12 distinct positions by rotation alone. These are illustrated above in the cycle graph format, along with the 180° edge (blue arrows) and 120° vertex (reddish arrows) rotations that permute the tetrahedron through those positions.	One face of the tetrakis hexahedron is a fundamental domain of T_{d}.

T, 332, [3,3]^{+}, or 23, of order 12 – chiral or rotational tetrahedral symmetry. There are three orthogonal 2-fold rotation axes, like chiral dihedral symmetry D_{2} or 222, with in addition four 3-fold axes, centered between the three orthogonal directions. This group is isomorphic to A_{4}, the alternating group on 4 elements; in fact it is the group of even permutations of the four 3-fold axes: e, (123), (132), (124), (142), (134), (143), (234), (243), (12)(34), (13)(24), (14)(23).

The conjugacy classes of T are:

- identity
- 4 × rotation by 120° clockwise (seen from a vertex): (234), (143), (412), (321)
- 4 × rotation by 120° counterclockwise (ditto)
- 3 × rotation by 180°

The rotations by 180°, together with the identity, form a normal subgroup of type D_{4} (the Klein four-group), with quotient group of type Z_{3}. The three elements of the latter are the identity, "clockwise rotation", and "anti-clockwise rotation", corresponding to permutations of the three orthogonal 2-fold axes, preserving orientation.

A_{4} is the smallest group showing that the converse of Lagrange's theorem does not hold in general: 6 divides its order 12, but it has no subgroup of order 6.

Under the double cover of the rotation group by SU(2), the preimage of T is the binary tetrahedral group of order 24; see also binary polyhedral group.

=== Subgroups of chiral tetrahedral symmetry ===
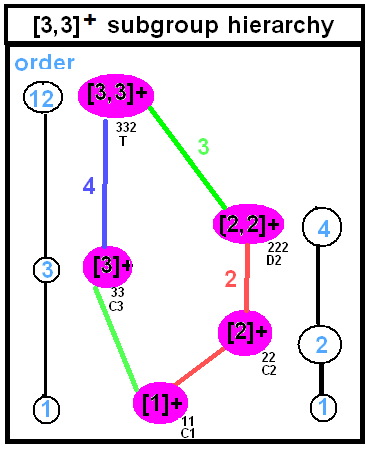
Chiral tetrahedral symmetry subgroups

Schoe.	Coxeter		Orb.	H-M	Generators	Structure	Cyc	Order	Index
T	[3,3]^{+}	=	332	23	2	A_{4}		12	1
D_{2}	[2,2]^{+}	=	222	222	2	D_{4}		4	3
C_{3}	[3]^{+}		33	3	1	Z_{3}		3	4
C_{2}	[2]^{+}		22	2	1	Z_{2}		2	6
C_{1}	[ ]^{+}		11	1	1	Z_{1}		1	12

== Achiral tetrahedral symmetry ==
The full tetrahedral group T_{d} with fundamental domain

T_{d}, *332, [3,3] or 4̅3m, of order 24 – achiral or full tetrahedral symmetry, also known as the (2,3,3) triangle group. This group has the same rotation axes as T, but with six mirror planes, each through two 3-fold axes. The 2-fold axes are now S_{4} (4̅) axes. T_{d} and O are isomorphic as abstract groups: they both correspond to S_{4}, the symmetric group on 4 objects. T_{d} is the union of T and the set obtained by combining each element of O \ T with inversion.

The conjugacy classes of T_{d} are:

- identity
- 8 × rotation by 120° (C_{3})
- 3 × rotation by 180° (C_{2})
- 6 × reflection in a plane through two rotation axes (C_{s})
- 6 × rotoreflection by 90° (S_{4})

=== Subgroups of achiral tetrahedral symmetry ===
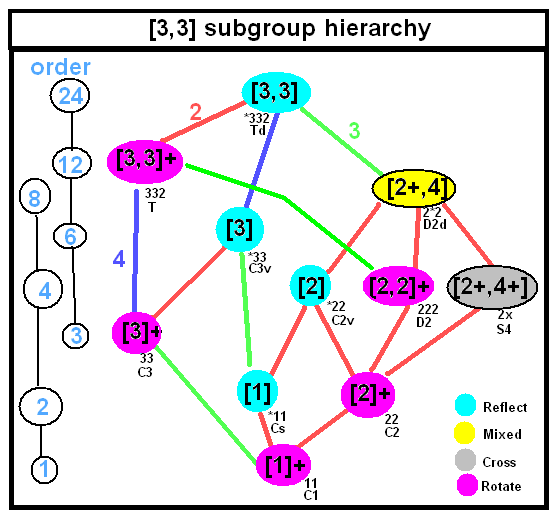
Achiral tetrahedral subgroups

Schoe.	Coxeter	Orb.	H-M	Generators	Structure	Cyc	Order	Index
T_{d}	[3,3]	*332	4̅3m	3	S_{4}		24	1
C_{3v}	[3]	*33	3m	2	D_{6}=S_{3}		6	4
C_{2v}	[2]	*22	mm2	2	D_{4}		4	6
C_{s}	[ ]	*	2̅ or m	1	Z_{2} = D_{2}		2	12
D_{2d}	[2^{+},4]	2*2	4̅2m	2	D_{8}		8	3
S_{4}	[2^{+},4^{+}]	2×	4̅	1	Z_{4}		4	6
T	[3,3]^{+}	332	23	2	A_{4}		12	2
D_{2}	[2,2]^{+}	222	222	2	D_{4}		4	6
C_{3}	[3]^{+}	33	3	1	Z_{3} = A_{3}		3	8
C_{2}	[2]^{+}	22	2	1	Z_{2}		2	12
C_{1}	[ ]^{+}	11	1	1	Z_{1}		1	24

== Pyritohedral symmetry ==
The pyritohedral group T_{h} with fundamental domain

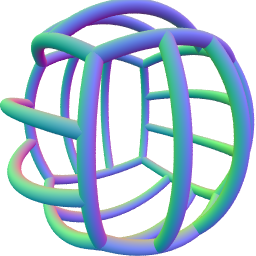
The seams of a volleyball have pyritohedral symmetry.

T_{h}, 3*2, [4,3^{+}] or m3̅, of order 24 – pyritohedral symmetry. This group has the same rotation axes as T, and three mirror planes, each containing two of the 2-fold axes. The 3-fold axes are now S_{6} (3̅) axes, and there is a central inversion symmetry. T_{h} is isomorphic to T × Z_{2}: every element of T_{h} is either an element of T, or one combined with inversion. Apart from these two normal subgroups, there is also a normal subgroup D_{2h} (that of a cuboid), of type D_{4} × Z_{2} = Z_{2} × Z_{2} × Z_{2}. It is the direct product of the normal subgroup of T (see above) with C_{i}. As for T, the quotient group is of type Z_{3}.

It is the symmetry of a pyritohedron, and of a cube with on each face a line segment dividing the face into two equal rectangles, such that the line segments of adjacent faces do not meet at the edge. The symmetries correspond to the even permutations of the body diagonals and the same combined with inversion. It is a subgroup of the full icosahedral symmetry group (as isometry group, not just as abstract group), with 4 of the 10 3-fold axes.

Since the inversion commutes with all elements, the conjugacy classes of T_{h} are those of T, and the same classes combined with inversion:

- identity
- 4 × rotation by 120° clockwise (C_{3})
- 4 × rotation by 120° counterclockwise (C_{3}^{2})
- 3 × rotation by 180° (C_{2})
- inversion (S_{2})
- 4 × rotoreflection by 60° clockwise (S_{6})
- 4 × rotoreflection by 60° counterclockwise (S_{6}^{5})
- 3 × reflection in a plane (C_{s})

=== Subgroups of pyritohedral symmetry ===
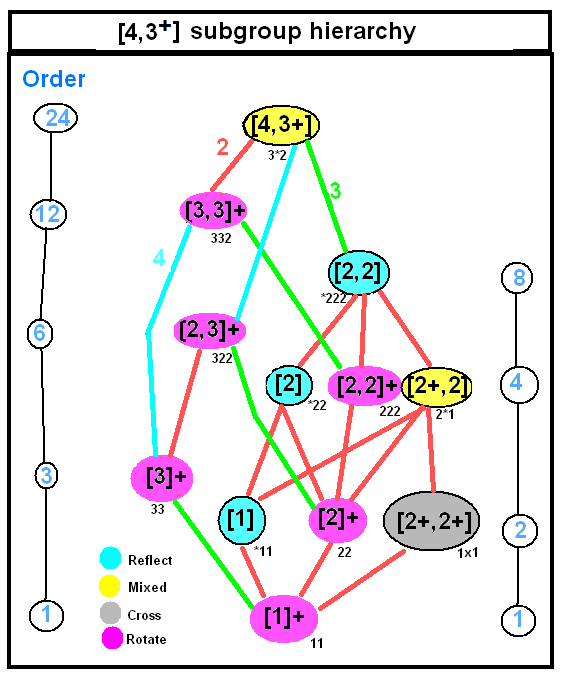
Pyritohedral subgroups

Schoe.	Coxeter	Orb.	H-M	Generators	Structure	Cyc	Order	Index
T_{h}	[3^{+},4]	3*2	m3̅	2	A_{4}×Z_{2}		24	1
D_{2h}	[2,2]	*222	mmm	3	D_{4}×Z_{2}		8	3
C_{2v}	[2]	*22	mm2	2	D_{4}		4	6
C_{s}	[ ]	*	2̅ or m	1	Z_{2} = D_{2}		2	12
C_{2h}	[2^{+},2]	2*	2/m	2	D_{4}		4	6
S_{2}	[2^{+},2^{+}]	×	1̅	1	Z_{2}		2	12
S_{6}	[2^{+},6^{+}]	3×	3̅	1	Z_{6}		6	4
T	[3,3]^{+}	332	23	2	A_{4}		12	2
D_{2}	[2,2]^{+}	222	222	2	D_{4}		4	6
C_{3}	[3]^{+}	33	3	1	Z_{3}		3	8
C_{2}	[2]^{+}	22	2	1	Z_{2}		2	12
C_{1}	[ ]^{+}	11	1	1	Z_{1}		1	24

== Solids with tetrahedral symmetry ==
The following solids have full tetrahedral symmetry T_{d}:

Class	Name	Picture	Faces	Edges	Vertices
Platonic solid	tetrahedron	Tetrahedron	4	6	4
Archimedean solid	truncated tetrahedron	Truncated tetrahedron	8	18	12
Catalan solid	triakis tetrahedron	Triakis tetrahedron	12	18	8
Near-miss Johnson solid	Truncated triakis tetrahedron		16	42	28
Near-miss Johnson solid	Tetrated dodecahedron		28	54	28
Uniform star polyhedron	Tetrahemihexahedron		7	12	6

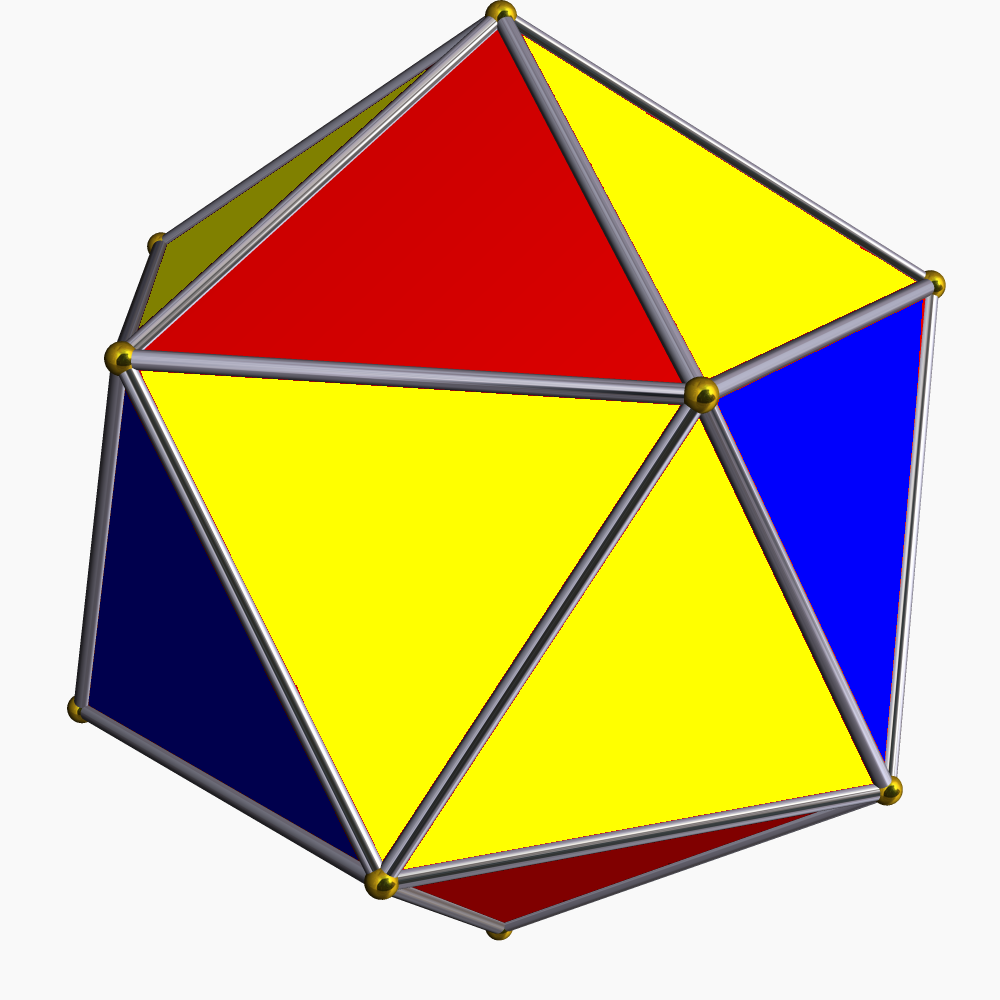
The icosahedron colored as a snub tetrahedron has only chiral tetrahedral symmetry T.
