= List of polygons, polyhedra and polytopes =

A polytope is a geometric object with flat sides, which exists in any general number of dimensions. The following list of polygons, polyhedra and polytopes gives the names of various classes of polytopes and lists some specific examples.

== Polytope elements ==
=== Polygon (2-polytope) ===
- Vertex the ridge or (n−2)-face of the polygon
- Edge the facet or (n−1)-face of the polygon

=== Polyhedron (3-polytope) ===
- Vertex the peak or (n−3)-face of the polyhedron
- Edge the ridge or (n−2)-face of the polyhedron
- Face the facet or (n−1)-face of the polyhedron

=== Polychoron (4-polytope) ===
- Vertex the (n−4)-face of the polychoron
- Edge the peak or (n−3)-face of the polychoron
- Face the ridge or (n−2)-face of the polychoron
- Cell the facet or (n−1)-face of the polychoron

=== Polyteron (5-polytope) ===
- Vertex the (n−5)-face of the 5-polytope
- Edge the (n−4)-face of the 5-polytope
- Face the peak or (n−3)-face of the 5-polytope
- Cell the ridge or (n−2)-face of the 5-polytope
- Hypercell or Teron the facet or (n−1)-face of the 5-polytope

=== Other ===
- Point
- Line segment
- Vertex figure
- Peak – (n−3)-face
- Ridge – (n−2)-face
- Facet – (n−1)-face

== Two dimensional (polygons) ==
- Triangle
  - Equilateral triangle
  - Isosceles triangle
    - Golden triangle (mathematics)
  - Scalene triangle
  - Right triangle
  - Oblique triangle
    - Acute triangle
    - Obtuse Triangle
- Quadrilateral
  - Rectangle
    - Square
      - Unit square
    - Oblong
      - Golden rectangle
      - Silver rectangle
      - Ailles rectangle
  - Rhombus
    - Golden Rhombus
  - Parallelogram
    - Rhomboid
  - Trapezoid
    - Isosceles trapezoid
  - Kite
    - Lute of pythagoras
    - Right Kite
  - Antiparallelogram
- Pentagon
- Hexagon
- Heptagon
- Octagon
- Nonagon
- Decagon
- Hendecagon
- Dodecagon
- Triskaidecagon
- Tetradecagon
- Pentadecagon
- Hexadecagon
- Heptadecagon
- Octadecagon
- Enneadecagon
- Icosagon
- Icosihenagon
- Icosidigon
- Icositrigon
- Icositetragon
- Icosipentagon
- Icosihexagon
- Icosiheptagon
- Icosioctagon
- Icosienneagon
- Triacontagon
- Tetracontagon
- Pentacontagon
- Hexacontagon
- Heptacontagon
- Octacontagon
- Enneacontagon
- Hectogon
- 257-gon
- Chiliagon
- Myriagon
- 65537-gon
- Megagon
- Gigagon
- Teragon
- Apeirogon

=== Star polygons ===
- Pentagram
- Hexagram
- Heptagram
- Octagram
- Enneagram
- Decagram
- Hendecagram
- Dodecagram
- Icositetragram

=== Families ===
- Concave polygon
- Cyclic polygon
- Regular polygon
- Polyform
- Gnomon
- Golygon

=== Tilings ===
List of uniform tilings

Uniform tilings in hyperbolic plane

Archimedean tiling

- Square tiling
- Triangular tiling
- Hexagonal tiling
- Truncated square tiling
- Snub square tiling
- Trihexagonal tiling
- Truncated hexagonal tiling
- Rhombitrihexagonal tiling
- Truncated trihexagonal tiling
- Snub hexagonal tiling
- Elongated triangular tiling

== Three dimensional (polyhedra) ==
Three-dimensional space

=== Regular ===
Regular polyhedron

- Platonic solid:
  - Tetrahedron, Cube, Octahedron, Dodecahedron, Icosahedron
- Regular spherical polyhedron
  - Dihedron, Hosohedron
- Kepler–Poinsot polyhedron (Regular star polyhedra)
  - Small stellated dodecahedron, Great stellated dodecahedron, Great icosahedron, Great dodecahedron
- Abstract regular polyhedra (Projective polyhedron)
  - Hemicube (geometry), hemi-octahedron, hemi-dodecahedron, hemi-icosahedron

Tetrahedron

- Disphenoid

Pentahedron

- Square pyramid, Triangular prism

Hexahedron

- Parallelepiped, Cuboid, Rhombohedron, Trigonal trapezohedron, Cube, Pentagonal pyramid, Triangular bipyramid, quadrilateral frustum

Heptahedron

- hexagonal pyramid, pentagonal prism, tetrahemihexahedron

Octahedron

- Hexagonal prism, Truncated tetrahedron, Tetragonal trapezohedron

Enneahedron

- Octagonal pyramid, Heptagonal prism

Decahedron

- Octagonal prism, Square antiprism, Square cupola, Pentagonal bipyramid, Augmented pentagonal prism

Dodecahedron

- Pentagonal antiprism, Decagonal prism, Pentagonal cupola, Snub disphenoid, Elongated square bipyramid, Metabidiminished icosahedron, Hexagonal bipyramid, Hexagonal trapezohedron, Triakis tetrahedron, Rhombic dodecahedron, Hendecagonal pyramid, Trapezo-rhombic dodecahedron, Rhombo-hexagonal dodecahedron

=== Archimedean solids ===
Archimedean solid

- Truncated tetrahedron, Cuboctahedron, Truncated cube, Truncated octahedron, Rhombicuboctahedron, Truncated cuboctahedron, Snub cube, Icosidodecahedron, Truncated dodecahedron, Truncated icosahedron, Rhombicosidodecahedron, Truncated icosidodecahedron, Snub dodecahedron

=== Prisms and antiprisms ===
Prism

- Triangular prism, Pentagonal prism, Hexagonal prism, Heptagonal prism, Octagonal prism, Enneagonal prism, Decagonal prism, Hendecagonal prism, Dodecagonal prism

Antiprism

- Square antiprism, Pentagonal antiprism, Hexagonal antiprism, Heptagonal antiprism, Octagonal antiprism, Enneagonal antiprism, Decagonal antiprism, Dodecagonal antiprism

=== Catalan solids ===
Catalan solid

- Triakis tetrahedron, Rhombic dodecahedron, Triakis octahedron, Tetrakis hexahedron, Deltoidal icositetrahedron, Disdyakis dodecahedron, Pentagonal icositetrahedron, Rhombic triacontahedron, Triakis icosahedron, Pentakis dodecahedron, Deltoidal hexecontahedron, Disdyakis triacontahedron, Pentagonal hexecontahedron

=== Bipyramids and Trapezohedron ===
- Bipyramid
  - Triangular bipyramid, Pentagonal bipyramid, Hexagonal bipyramid, Heptagonal bipyramid, Octagonal bipyramid, Decagonal bipyramid
- Trapezohedron
  - Trigonal trapezohedron

=== Uniform star polyhedra ===
Uniform star polyhedron

- Cubitruncated cuboctahedron
- Cubohemioctahedron
- Ditrigonal dodecadodecahedron
- Dodecadodecahedron
- Great cubicuboctahedron
- Great dirhombicosidodecahedron
- Great disnub dirhombidodecahedron
- Great ditrigonal dodecicosidodecahedron
- Great ditrigonal icosidodecahedron
- Great dodecahemicosahedron
- Great dodecahemidodecahedron
- Great dodecicosahedron
- Great dodecicosidodecahedron
- Great icosicosidodecahedron
- Great icosidodecahedron
- Great icosihemidodecahedron
- Great inverted snub icosidodecahedron
- Great retrosnub icosidodecahedron
- Great rhombidodecahedron
- Great rhombihexahedron
- Great snub dodecicosidodecahedron
- Great snub icosidodecahedron
- Great stellated truncated dodecahedron
- Great truncated cuboctahedron
- Great truncated icosidodecahedron
- Icosidodecadodecahedron
- Icositruncated dodecadodecahedron
- Inverted snub dodecadodecahedron
- Nonconvex great rhombicosidodecahedron
- Nonconvex great rhombicuboctahedron
- Octahemioctahedron
- Rhombicosahedron
- Rhombidodecadodecahedron
- Small cubicuboctahedron
- Small ditrigonal dodecicosidodecahedron
- Small ditrigonal icosidodecahedron
- Small dodecahemicosahedron
- Small dodecahemidodecahedron
- Small dodecicosahedron
- Small dodecicosidodecahedron
- Small icosicosidodecahedron
- Small icosihemidodecahedron
- Small retrosnub icosicosidodecahedron
- Small rhombidodecahedron
- Small rhombihexahedron
- Small snub icosicosidodecahedron
- Small stellated truncated dodecahedron
- Snub dodecadodecahedron
- Snub icosidodecadodecahedron
- Stellated truncated hexahedron
- Tetrahemihexahedron
- Truncated dodecadodecahedron
- Truncated great dodecahedron
- Truncated great icosahedron

=== Uniform prismatic star polyhedra ===
Prismatic uniform polyhedron

- Pentagrammic prism, Pentagrammic antiprism, Pentagrammic crossed-antiprism
- Heptagrammic antiprism (7/2), Heptagrammic antiprism (7/3)
- Enneagrammic antiprism (9/2), Enneagrammic antiprism (9/4)
- Enneagrammic crossed-antiprism, Enneagrammic prism (9/2), Enneagrammic prism (9/4)
- Decagrammic prism, Decagrammic antiprism

=== Johnson solids ===
Johnson solid

1. Augmented dodecahedron
2. Augmented hexagonal prism
3. Augmented pentagonal prism
4. Augmented sphenocorona
5. Augmented triangular prism
6. Augmented tridiminished icosahedron
7. Augmented truncated cube
8. Augmented truncated dodecahedron
9. Augmented truncated tetrahedron
10. Biaugmented pentagonal prism
11. Biaugmented triangular prism
12. Biaugmented truncated cube
13. Bigyrate diminished rhombicosidodecahedron
14. Bilunabirotunda
15. Diminished rhombicosidodecahedron
16. Disphenocingulum
17. Elongated pentagonal bipyramid
18. Elongated pentagonal cupola
19. Elongated pentagonal gyrobicupola
20. Elongated pentagonal gyrobirotunda
21. Elongated pentagonal gyrocupolarotunda
22. Elongated pentagonal orthobicupola
23. Elongated pentagonal orthobirotunda
24. Elongated pentagonal orthocupolarotunda
25. Elongated pentagonal pyramid
26. Elongated pentagonal rotunda
27. Elongated square bipyramid
28. Elongated square cupola
29. Elongated square gyrobicupola
30. Elongated square pyramid
31. Elongated triangular bipyramid
32. Elongated triangular cupola
33. Elongated triangular gyrobicupola
34. Elongated triangular orthobicupola
35. Elongated triangular pyramid
36. Gyrate bidiminished rhombicosidodecahedron
37. Gyrate rhombicosidodecahedron
38. Gyrobifastigium
39. Gyroelongated pentagonal bicupola
40. Gyroelongated pentagonal birotunda
41. Gyroelongated pentagonal cupola
42. Gyroelongated pentagonal cupolarotunda
43. Gyroelongated pentagonal pyramid
44. Gyroelongated pentagonal rotunda
45. Gyroelongated square bicupola
46. Gyroelongated square bipyramid
47. Gyroelongated square cupola
48. Gyroelongated square pyramid
49. Gyroelongated triangular bicupola
50. Gyroelongated triangular cupola
51. Hebesphenomegacorona
52. Metabiaugmented dodecahedron
53. Metabiaugmented hexagonal prism
54. Metabiaugmented truncated dodecahedron
55. Metabidiminished icosahedron
56. Metabidiminished rhombicosidodecahedron
57. Metabigyrate rhombicosidodecahedron
58. Metagyrate diminished rhombicosidodecahedron
59. Parabiaugmented dodecahedron
60. Parabiaugmented hexagonal prism
61. Parabiaugmented truncated dodecahedron
62. Parabidiminished rhombicosidodecahedron
63. Parabigyrate rhombicosidodecahedron
64. Paragyrate diminished rhombicosidodecahedron
65. Pentagonal bipyramid
66. Pentagonal cupola
67. Pentagonal gyrobicupola
68. Pentagonal gyrocupolarotunda
69. Pentagonal orthobicupola
70. Pentagonal orthobirotunda
71. Pentagonal orthocupolarotunda
72. Pentagonal pyramid
73. Pentagonal rotunda
74. Snub disphenoid
75. Snub square antiprism
76. Sphenocorona
77. Sphenomegacorona
78. Square cupola
79. Square gyrobicupola
80. Square orthobicupola
81. Square pyramid
82. Triangular bipyramid
83. Triangular cupola
84. Triangular hebesphenorotunda
85. Triangular orthobicupola
86. Triaugmented dodecahedron
87. Triaugmented hexagonal prism
88. Triaugmented triangular prism
89. Triaugmented truncated dodecahedron
90. Tridiminished icosahedron
91. Tridiminished rhombicosidodecahedron
92. Trigyrate rhombicosidodecahedron

=== Dual uniform star polyhedra ===
- Great complex icosidodecahedron
- Great deltoidal hexecontahedron
- Great deltoidal icositetrahedron
- Great dirhombicosidodecacron
- Great dirhombicosidodecahedron
- Great disdyakis dodecahedron
- Great disdyakis triacontahedron
- Great disnub dirhombidodecacron
- Great ditrigonal dodecacronic hexecontahedron
- Great dodecacronic hexecontahedron
- Great dodecahemicosacron
- Great dodecicosacron
- Great hexacronic icositetrahedron
- Great hexagonal hexecontahedron
- Great icosacronic hexecontahedron
- Great icosihemidodecacron
- Great inverted pentagonal hexecontahedron
- Great pentagonal hexecontahedron
- Great pentagrammic hexecontahedron
- Great pentakis dodecahedron
- Great rhombic triacontahedron
- Great rhombidodecacron
- Great rhombihexacron
- Great stellapentakis dodecahedron
- Great triakis icosahedron
- Great triakis octahedron
- Great triambic icosahedron
- Medial deltoidal hexecontahedron
- Medial disdyakis triacontahedron
- Medial hexagonal hexecontahedron
- Medial icosacronic hexecontahedron
- Medial inverted pentagonal hexecontahedron
- Medial pentagonal hexecontahedron
- Medial rhombic triacontahedron
- Hexahemioctacron
- Hemipolyhedron
- Octahemioctacron
- Rhombicosacron
- Small complex icosidodecahedron
- Small ditrigonal dodecacronic hexecontahedron
- Small dodecacronic hexecontahedron
- Small dodecahemicosacron
- Small dodecahemidodecacron
- Small dodecicosacron
- Small hexacronic icositetrahedron
- Small hexagonal hexecontahedron
- Small hexagrammic hexecontahedron
- Small icosacronic hexecontahedron
- Small icosihemidodecacron
- Small rhombidodecacron
- Small rhombihexacron
- Small stellapentakis dodecahedron
- Small triambic icosahedron
- Tetrahemihexacron

=== Honeycombs ===
Convex uniform honeycomb

- Cubic honeycomb
- Truncated cubic honeycomb
- Bitruncated cubic honeycomb
- Cantellated cubic honeycomb
- Cantitruncated cubic honeycomb
- Rectified cubic honeycomb
- Runcitruncated cubic honeycomb
- Omnitruncated cubic honeycomb
- Tetrahedral-octahedral honeycomb
- Truncated alternated cubic honeycomb
- Cantitruncated alternated cubic honeycomb
- Runcinated alternated cubic honeycomb
- Quarter cubic honeycomb
- Gyrated tetrahedral-octahedral honeycomb
- Gyrated triangular prismatic honeycomb
- Gyroelongated alternated cubic honeycomb
- Gyroelongated triangular prismatic honeycomb
- Elongated triangular prismatic honeycomb
- Elongated alternated cubic honeycomb
- Hexagonal prismatic honeycomb
- Triangular prismatic honeycomb
- Triangular-hexagonal prismatic honeycomb
- Truncated hexagonal prismatic honeycomb
- Truncated square prismatic honeycomb
- Rhombitriangular-hexagonal prismatic honeycomb
- Omnitruncated triangular-hexagonal prismatic honeycomb
- Snub triangular-hexagonal prismatic honeycomb
- Snub square prismatic honeycomb

Dual uniform honeycomb

- Disphenoid tetrahedral honeycomb
- Rhombic dodecahedral honeycomb

Others

- Trapezo-rhombic dodecahedral honeycomb
- Weaire–Phelan structure

Convex uniform honeycombs in hyperbolic space

- Order-4 dodecahedral honeycomb
- Order-5 cubic honeycomb
- Order-5 dodecahedral honeycomb
- Icosahedral honeycomb

=== Other ===
- Apeirogonal prism
- Apeirohedron
- Bicupola
- Bifrusta
  - Triangular bifrustum
  - Square bifrustum
  - Pentagonal bifrustum
  - Hexagonal bifrustum
- Cupola
- Bifrustum
- Boerdijk–Coxeter helix
- Császár polyhedron
- Flexible polyhedron
- Goldberg polyhedron
- Heronian tetrahedron
- Hexagonal truncated trapezohedron
- Hill tetrahedron
- Holyhedron
- Infinite skew polyhedron
- Jessen's icosahedron
- Near-miss Johnson solid
  - Tetrated dodecahedron
  - Truncated triakis tetrahedron
- Parallelepiped
- Polytetrahedron
- Pyritohedron
- Rhombic enneacontahedron
- Rhombic icosahedron
- Rhombo-hexagonal dodecahedron
- Rhombohedron
- Scalenohedron
- Schönhardt polyhedron
- Square truncated trapezohedron
- Szilassi polyhedron
- Tetradecahedron
- Tetradyakis hexahedron
- Triaugmented triangular prism
- Truncated rhombic dodecahedron
- Truncated trapezohedron
- Tridyakis icosahedron
- Regular skew polyhedron
- Waterman polyhedron
- Wedge

=== Regular and uniform compound polyhedra ===
Polyhedral compound and Uniform polyhedron compound

- Compound of cube and octahedron
- Compound of dodecahedron and icosahedron
- Compound of eight octahedra with rotational freedom
- Compound of eight triangular prisms
- Compound of five cubes
- Compound of five cuboctahedra
- Compound of five cubohemioctahedra
- Compound of five great cubicuboctahedra
- Compound of five great dodecahedra
- Compound of five great icosahedra
- Compound of five great rhombihexahedra
- Compound of five icosahedra
- Compound of five octahedra
- Compound of five octahemioctahedra
- Compound of five small cubicuboctahedra
- Compound of five small rhombicuboctahedra
- Compound of five small rhombihexahedra
- Compound of five small stellated dodecahedra
- Compound of five stellated truncated cubes
- Compound of five tetrahedra
- Compound of five tetrahemihexahedra
- Compound of five truncated cubes
- Compound of five truncated tetrahedra
- Compound of five uniform great rhombicuboctahedra
- Compound of four hexagonal prisms
- Compound of four octahedra
- Compound of four octahedra with rotational freedom
- Compound of four tetrahedra
- Compound of four triangular prisms
- Compound of great icosahedron and great stellated dodecahedron
- Compound of six cubes with rotational freedom
- Compound of six decagonal prisms
- Compound of six decagrammic prisms
- Compound of six pentagonal prisms
- Compound of six pentagrammic crossed antiprisms
- Compound of six pentagrammic prisms
- Compound of six tetrahedra
- Compound of six tetrahedra with rotational freedom
- Compound of small stellated dodecahedron and great dodecahedron
- Compound of ten hexagonal prisms
- Compound of ten octahedra
- Compound of ten tetrahedra
- Compound of ten triangular prisms
- Compound of ten truncated tetrahedra
- Compound of three cubes
- Compound of three tetrahedra
- Compound of twelve pentagonal antiprisms with rotational freedom
- Compound of twelve pentagonal prisms
- Compound of twelve pentagrammic prisms
- Compound of twelve tetrahedra with rotational freedom
- Compound of twenty octahedra
- Compound of twenty octahedra with rotational freedom
- Compound of twenty tetrahemihexahedra
- Compound of twenty triangular prisms
- Compound of two great dodecahedra
- Compound of two great icosahedra
- Compound of two great inverted snub icosidodecahedra
- Compound of two great retrosnub icosidodecahedra
- Compound of two great snub icosidodecahedra
- Compound of two icosahedra
- Compound of two inverted snub dodecadodecahedra
- Compound of two small stellated dodecahedra
- Compound of two snub cubes
- Compound of two snub dodecadodecahedra
- Compound of two snub dodecahedra
- Compound of two snub icosidodecadodecahedra
- Compound of two truncated tetrahedra
- Prismatic compound of antiprisms
- Prismatic compound of antiprisms with rotational freedom
- Prismatic compound of prisms
- Prismatic compound of prisms with rotational freedom

== Four dimensions ==
Four-dimensional space

4-polytope – general term for a four dimensional polytope

Regular 4-polytope

- 5-cell, Tesseract, 16-cell, 24-cell, 120-cell, 600-cell

Abstract regular polytope

- 11-cell, 57-cell

Regular star 4-polytope

- Icosahedral 120-cell, Small stellated 120-cell, Great 120-cell, Grand 120-cell, Great stellated 120-cell, Grand stellated 120-cell, Great grand 120-cell, Great icosahedral 120-cell, Grand 600-cell, Great grand stellated 120-cell

Uniform 4-polytope

- Rectified 5-cell, Truncated 5-cell, Cantellated 5-cell, Runcinated 5-cell
- Rectified tesseract, Truncated tesseract, Cantellated tesseract, Runcinated tesseract
- Rectified 16-cell, Truncated 16-cell
- Rectified 24-cell, Truncated 24-cell, Cantellated 24-cell, Runcinated 24-cell, Snub 24-cell
- Rectified 120-cell, Truncated 120-cell, Cantellated 120-cell, Runcinated 120-cell
- Rectified 600-cell, Truncated 600-cell, Cantellated 600-cell

Prismatic uniform 4-polytope

- Grand antiprism
- Duoprism
- Tetrahedral prism, Truncated tetrahedral prism
- Truncated cubic prism, Truncated octahedral prism, Cuboctahedral prism, Rhombicuboctahedral prism, Truncated cuboctahedral prism, Snub cubic prism
- Truncated dodecahedral prism, Truncated icosahedral prism, Icosidodecahedral prism, Rhombicosidodecahedral prism, Truncated icosidodecahedral prism, Snub dodecahedral prism

Uniform antiprismatic prism

- Triangular antiprismatic prism, Square antiprismatic prism, Pentagonal antiprismatic prism, Hexagonal antiprismatic prism, Heptagonal antiprismatic prism, Octagonal antiprismatic prism, Enneagonal antiprismatic prism, Decagonal antiprismatic prism
- Pentagrammic antiprismatic prism, Hexagrammic antiprismatic prism, Heptagrammic antiprismatic prism, Octagrammic antiprismatic prism, Enneagrammic antiprismatic prism, Decagrammic antiprismatic prism
- Pentagrammic crossed antiprismatic prism, Hexagrammic crossed antiprismatic prism, Heptagrammic crossed antiprismatic prism, Octagrammic crossed antiprismatic prism, Enneagrammic crossed antiprismatic prism, Decagrammic crossed antiprismatic prism

=== Honeycombs ===
- Tesseractic honeycomb
- 24-cell honeycomb
- Snub 24-cell honeycomb
- Rectified 24-cell honeycomb
- Truncated 24-cell honeycomb
- 16-cell honeycomb
- 5-cell honeycomb
- Omnitruncated 5-cell honeycomb
- Truncated 5-cell honeycomb
- Omnitruncated 5-simplex honeycomb

== Five dimensions ==
Five-dimensional space, 5-polytope and uniform 5-polytope

- 5-simplex, Rectified 5-simplex, Truncated 5-simplex, Cantellated 5-simplex, Runcinated 5-simplex, Stericated 5-simplex
- 5-demicube, Truncated 5-demicube, Cantellated 5-demicube, Runcinated 5-demicube
- 5-cube, Rectified 5-cube, Truncated 5-cube, Cantellated 5-cube, Runcinated 5-cube, Stericated 5-cube
- 5-orthoplex, Rectified 5-orthoplex, Truncated 5-orthoplex, Cantellated 5-orthoplex, Runcinated 5-orthoplex

Prismatic uniform 5-polytope

- 5-cell prism, Rectified 5-cell prism, Truncated 5-cell prism, Cantellated 5-cell prism, Runcinated 5-cell prism, Bitruncated 5-cell prism, Cantitruncated 5-cell prism, Runcitruncated 5-cell prism, Omnitruncated 5-cell prism
- Tesseractic prism, Rectified tesseractic prism, Truncated tesseractic prism, Cantellated tesseractic prism, Runcinated tesseractic prism, Bitruncated tesseractic prism, Cantitruncated tesseractic prism, Runcitruncated tesseractic prism, Omnitruncated tesseractic prism
- 16-cell prism, Truncated 16-cell prism, Runcitruncated 16-cell prism
- 24-cell prism, rectified 24-cell prism, truncated 24-cell prism, cantellated 24-cell prism, runcinated 24-cell prism, bitruncated 24-cell prism, cantitruncated 24-cell prism, runcitruncated 24-cell prism, omnitruncated 24-cell prism, snub 24-cell prism
- 120-cell prism, Rectified 120-cell prism, Truncated 120-cell prism, Cantellated 120-cell prism, Runcinated 120-cell prism, Bitruncated 120-cell prism, Cantitruncated 120-cell prism, Runcitruncated 120-cell prism, Omnitruncated 120-cell prism
- 600-cell prism, Rectified 600-cell prism, Truncated 600-cell prism, Cantellated 600-cell prism, Cantitruncated 600-cell prism, Runcitruncated 600-cell prism
- Grand antiprism prism

=== Honeycombs ===
- 5-cubic honeycomb
- 5-simplex honeycomb
- Truncated 5-simplex honeycomb
- 5-demicubic honeycomb

== Six dimensions ==
Six-dimensional space, 6-polytope and uniform 6-polytope

- 6-simplex, Rectified 6-simplex, Truncated 6-simplex, Cantellated 6-simplex, Runcinated 6-simplex, Stericated 6-simplex, Pentellated 6-simplex
- 6-demicube, Truncated 6-demicube, Cantellated 6-demicube, Runcinated 6-demicube, Stericated 6-demicube
- 6-cube, Rectified 6-cube, Truncated 6-cube, Cantellated 6-cube, Runcinated 6-cube, Stericated 6-cube, Pentellated 6-cube
- 6-orthoplex, Rectified 6-orthoplex, Truncated 6-orthoplex, Cantellated 6-orthoplex, Runcinated 6-orthoplex, Stericated 6-orthoplex
- 1_{22} polytope, 2_{21} polytope

=== Honeycombs ===
- 6-cubic honeycomb
- 6-simplex honeycomb
- 6-demicubic honeycomb
- 2_{22} honeycomb

== Seven dimensions ==
Seven-dimensional space, uniform 7-polytope

- 7-simplex, Rectified 7-simplex, Truncated 7-simplex, Cantellated 7-simplex, Runcinated 7-simplex, Stericated 7-simplex, Pentellated 7-simplex, Hexicated 7-simplex
- 7-demicube, Truncated 7-demicube, Cantellated 7-demicube, Runcinated 7-demicube, Stericated 7-demicube, Pentellated 7-demicube
- 7-cube, Rectified 7-cube, Truncated 7-cube, Cantellated 7-cube, Runcinated 7-cube, Stericated 7-cube, Pentellated 7-cube, Hexicated 7-cube
- 7-orthoplex, Rectified 7-orthoplex, Truncated 7-orthoplex, Cantellated 7-orthoplex, Runcinated 7-orthoplex, Stericated 7-orthoplex, Pentellated 7-orthoplex, Hexicated 7-orthoplex
- 1_{32} polytope, 2_{31} polytope, 3_{21} polytope

=== Honeycombs ===
- 7-cubic honeycomb
- 7-demicubic honeycomb
- 3_{31} honeycomb, 1_{33} honeycomb

== Eight dimension ==
Eight-dimensional space, uniform 8-polytope

- 8-simplex, Rectified 8-simplex, Truncated 8-simplex, Cantellated 8-simplex, Runcinated 8-simplex, Stericated 8-simplex, Pentellated 8-simplex, Hexicated 8-simplex, Heptellated 8-simplex
- 8-demicube, Truncated 8-demicube, Cantellated 8-demicube, Runcinated 8-demicube, Stericated 8-demicube, Pentellated 8-demicube, Hexicated 8-demicube
- 8-cube, Rectified 8-cube, Truncated 8-cube, Cantellated 8-cube, Runcinated 8-cube, Stericated 8-cube, Pentellated 8-cube, Hexicated 8-cube, Heptellated 8-cube
- 8-orthoplex, Rectified 8-orthoplex, Truncated 8-orthoplex, Cantellated 8-orthoplex, Runcinated 8-orthoplex, Stericated 8-orthoplex, Pentellated 8-orthoplex, Hexicated 8-orthoplex,
- 1_{42} polytope, 2_{41} polytope, 4_{21} polytope, Truncated 4_{21} polytope, Truncated 2_{41} polytope, Truncated 1_{42} polytope, Cantellated 4_{21} polytope, Cantellated 2_{41} polytope, Runcinated 4_{21} polytope

=== Honeycombs ===
- 8-cubic honeycomb
- 8-demicubic honeycomb
- 5_{21} honeycomb, 2_{51} honeycomb, 1_{52} honeycomb

== Nine dimensions ==
9-polytope

- 9-simplex
- 9-demicube
- 9-cube
- 9-orthoplex

=== Hyperbolic honeycombs ===
- E_{9} honeycomb

== Ten dimensions ==
10-polytope

- 10-simplex
- 10-demicube
- 10-cube
- 10-orthoplex

== Dimensional families ==
Regular polytope and List of regular polytopes

- Simplex
- Hypercube
- Cross-polytope

Uniform polytope

- Demihypercube
- Uniform 1_{k2} polytope
- Uniform 2_{k1} polytope
- Uniform k_{21} polytope

Honeycombs

- Hypercubic honeycomb
- Alternated hypercubic honeycomb

== Geometric operators ==
- Rectification (geometry)
- Truncation (geometry)
- Bitruncation
- Cantellation
- Runcination
- Sterication
- Omnitruncation
- Expansion (geometry)
- Snub (geometry)
- Alternation (geometry)
- Dual polyhedron
- Gyration (geometry)
- Elongation (geometry)
- Augmentation (geometry)
- Diminishment (geometry)
- Greatening (geometry)
- Aggrandizement (geometry)
- Stellation
- Kleetope
- Conway polyhedron notation

== See also ==
- List of geometry topics

Fundamental convex regular and uniform polytopes
Family	A_{n}	B_{n}	I_{2}(p) / D_{n}	E_{6} / E_{7} / E_{8} / F_{4} / G_{2}	H_{n}
Regular polygon	Triangle	Square	p-gon	Hexagon	Pentagon
Uniform polyhedron	Tetrahedron	Octahedron • Cube	Demicube		Dodecahedron • Icosahedron
Uniform polychoron	Pentachoron	16-cell • Tesseract	Demitesseract	24-cell	120-cell • 600-cell
Uniform 5-polytope	5-simplex	5-orthoplex • 5-cube	5-demicube		
Uniform 6-polytope	6-simplex	6-orthoplex • 6-cube	6-demicube	1_{22} • 2_{21}	
Uniform 7-polytope	7-simplex	7-orthoplex • 7-cube	7-demicube	1_{32} • 2_{31} • 3_{21}	
Uniform 8-polytope	8-simplex	8-orthoplex • 8-cube	8-demicube	1_{42} • 2_{41} • 4_{21}	
Uniform n-polytope	n-simplex	n-orthoplex • n-cube	n-demicube	1_{k2} • 2_{k1} • k_{21}	n-pentagonal polytope
Topics: Polytope families • Regular polytope • List of regular polytopes and compounds • Polytope operations
