= Prismatic uniform 4-polytope =

Type of uniform 4-polytope in four-dimensional geography

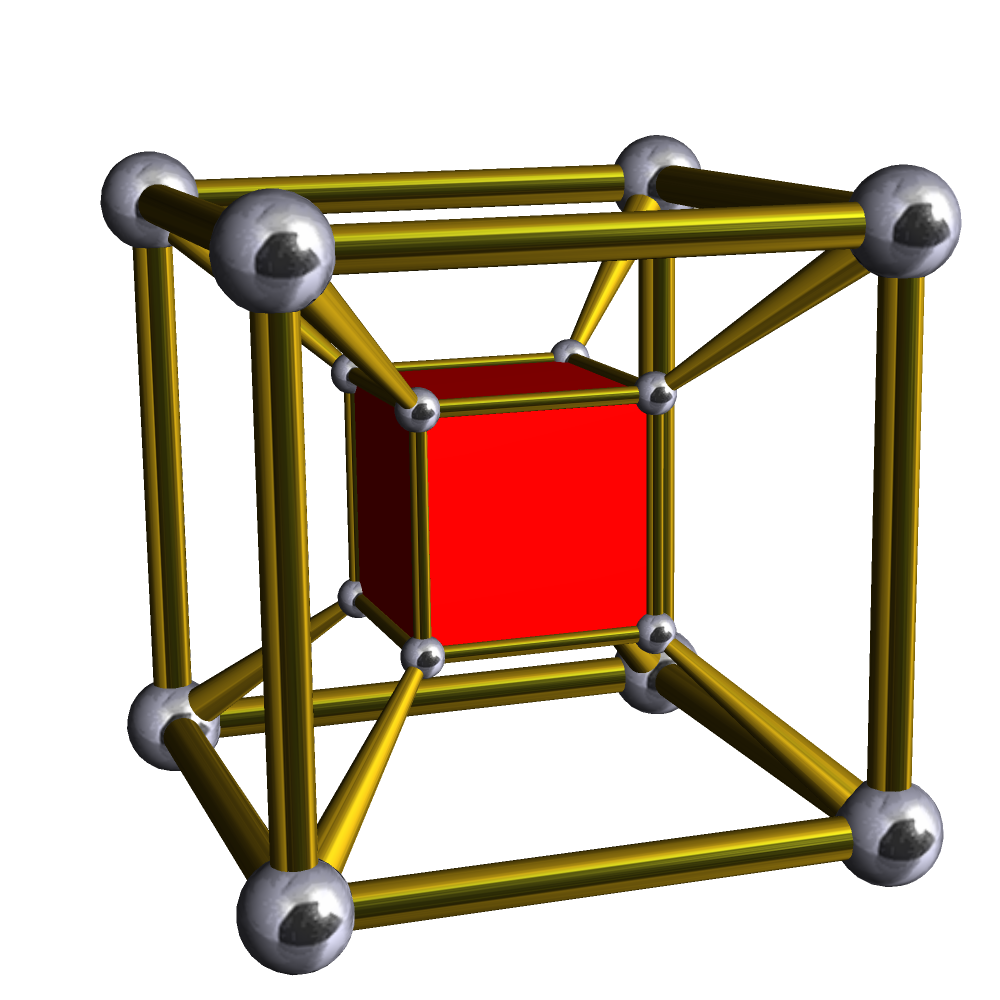
A cubic prism, {4,3}×{}, is a lower symmetry construction of the regular tesseract, {4,3,3}, as a prism of two parallel cubes, as seen in this Schlegel diagram

In four-dimensional geometry, a prismatic uniform 4-polytope is a uniform 4-polytope with a nonconnected Coxeter diagram symmetry group. These figures are analogous to the set of prisms and antiprism uniform polyhedra, but add a third category called duoprisms, constructed as a product of two regular polygons.

The prismatic uniform 4-polytopes consist of two infinite families:

- Polyhedral prisms: products of a line segment and a uniform polyhedron. This family is infinite because it includes prisms built on 3-dimensional prisms and antiprisms.
- Duoprisms: product of two regular polygons.

== Convex polyhedral prisms ==
The most obvious family of prismatic 4-polytopes is the polyhedral prisms, i.e. products of a polyhedron with a line segment. The cells of such a 4-polytope are two identical uniform polyhedra lying in parallel hyperplanes (the base cells) and a layer of prisms joining them (the lateral cells). This family includes prisms for the 75 nonprismatic uniform polyhedra (of which 18 are convex; one of these, the cube-prism, is listed above as the tesseract).

There are 18 convex polyhedral prisms created from 5 Platonic solids and 13 Archimedean solids as well as for the infinite families of three-dimensional prisms and antiprisms. The symmetry number of a polyhedral prism is twice that of the base polyhedron.

== Tetrahedral prisms: A_{3} × A_{1} ==
#	Johnson Name (Bowers style acronym)	Picture	Coxeter diagram and Schläfli symbols	Cells by type			Element counts			
#	Johnson Name (Bowers style acronym)	Picture	Coxeter diagram and Schläfli symbols	Cells by type			Cells	Faces	Edges	Vertices
48	Tetrahedral prism (tepe)		{3,3}×{}	2; 3.3.3	4; 3.4.4		6	8 {3} 6 {4}	16	8
49	Truncated tetrahedral prism (tuttip)		t{3,3}×{}	2; 3.6.6	4; 3.4.4	4; 4.4.6	10	8 {3} 18 {4} 8 {6}	48	24
[51]	Rectified tetrahedral prism (Same as octahedral prism) (ope)		r{3,3}×{}	2; 3.3.3.3	4; 3.4.4		6	16 {3} 12 {4}	30	12
[50]	Cantellated tetrahedral prism (Same as cuboctahedral prism) (cope)		rr{3,3}×{}	2; 3.4.3.4	8; 3.4.4	6; 4.4.4	16	16 {3} 36 {4}	60	24
[54]	Cantitruncated tetrahedral prism (Same as truncated octahedral prism) (tope)		tr{3,3}×{}	2; 4.6.6	8; 3.4.4	6; 4.4.4	16	48 {4} 16 {6}	96	48
[59]	Snub tetrahedral prism (Same as icosahedral prism) (ipe)		sr{3,3}×{}	2; 3.3.3.3.3	20; 3.4.4		22	40 {3} 30 {4}	72	24

== Octahedral prisms: BC_{3} × A_{1} ==
#	Johnson Name (Bowers style acronym)	Picture	Coxeter diagram and Schläfli symbols	Cells by type				Element counts			
#	Johnson Name (Bowers style acronym)	Picture	Coxeter diagram and Schläfli symbols	Cells by type				Cells	Faces	Edges	Vertices
[10]	Cubic prism (Same as tesseract) (Same as 4-4 duoprism) (tes)		{4,3}×{}	2; 4.4.4	6; 4.4.4			8	24 {4}	32	16
50	Cuboctahedral prism (Same as cantellated tetrahedral prism) (cope)		r{4,3}×{}	2; 3.4.3.4	8; 3.4.4	6; 4.4.4		16	16 {3} 36 {4}	60	24
51	Octahedral prism (Same as rectified tetrahedral prism) (Same as triangular antiprismatic prism) (ope)		{3,4}×{}	2; 3.3.3.3	8; 3.4.4			10	16 {3} 12 {4}	30	12
52	Rhombicuboctahedral prism (sircope)		rr{4,3}×{}	2; 3.4.4.4	8; 3.4.4	18; 4.4.4		28	16 {3} 84 {4}	120	96
53	Truncated cubic prism (ticcup)		t{4,3}×{}	2; 3.8.8	8; 3.4.4	6; 4.4.8		16	16 {3} 36 {4} 12 {8}	96	48
54	Truncated octahedral prism (Same as cantitruncated tetrahedral prism) (tope)		t{3,4}×{}	2; 4.6.6	6; 4.4.4	8; 4.4.6		16	48 {4} 16 {6}	96	48
55	Truncated cuboctahedral prism (gircope)		tr{4,3}×{}	2; 4.6.8	12; 4.4.4	8; 4.4.6	6; 4.4.8	28	96 {4} 16 {6} 12 {8}	192	96
56	Snub cubic prism (sniccup)		sr{4,3}×{}	2; 3.3.3.3.4	32; 3.4.4	6; 4.4.4		40	64 {3} 72 {4}	144	48

== Icosahedral prisms: H_{3} × A_{1} ==
#	Johnson Name (Bowers style acronym)	Picture	Coxeter diagram and Schläfli symbols	Cells by type				Element counts			
#	Johnson Name (Bowers style acronym)	Picture	Coxeter diagram and Schläfli symbols	Cells by type				Cells	Faces	Edges	Vertices
57	Dodecahedral prism (dope)		{5,3}×{}	2; 5.5.5	12; 4.4.5			14	30 {4} 24 {5}	80	40
58	Icosidodecahedral prism (iddip)		r{5,3}×{}	2; 3.5.3.5	20; 3.4.4	12; 4.4.5		34	40 {3} 60 {4} 24 {5}	150	60
59	Icosahedral prism (same as snub tetrahedral prism) (ipe)		{3,5}×{}	2; 3.3.3.3.3	20; 3.4.4			22	40 {3} 30 {4}	72	24
60	Truncated dodecahedral prism (tiddip)		t{5,3}×{}	2; 3.10.10	20; 3.4.4	12; 4.4.5		34	40 {3} 90 {4} 24 {10}	240	120
61	Rhombicosidodecahedral prism (sriddip)		rr{5,3}×{}	2; 3.4.5.4	20; 3.4.4	30; 4.4.4	12; 4.4.5	64	40 {3} 180 {4} 24 {5}	300	120
62	Truncated icosahedral prism (tipe)		t{3,5}×{}	2; 5.6.6	12; 4.4.5	20; 4.4.6		34	90 {4} 24 {5} 40 {6}	240	120
63	Truncated icosidodecahedral prism (griddip)		tr{5,3}×{}	2; 4.6.4.10	30; 4.4.4	20; 4.4.6	12; 4.4.10	64	240 {4} 40 {6} 24 {5}	480	240
64	Snub dodecahedral prism (sniddip)		sr{5,3}×{}	2; 3.3.3.3.5	80; 3.4.4	12; 4.4.5		94	240 {4} 40 {6} 24 {10}	360	120

== Duoprisms: [p] × [q] ==
Set of uniform p,q duoprisms
3-3	3-4	3-5	3-6	3-7	3-8
4-3	4-4	4-5	4-6	4-7	4-8
5-3	5-4	5-5	5-6	5-7	5-8
6-3	6-4	6-5	6-6	6-7	6-8
7-3	7-4	7-5	7-6	7-7	7-8
8-3	8-4	8-5	8-6	8-7	8-8

The second is the infinite family of uniform duoprisms, products of two regular polygons.

Their Coxeter diagram is of the form

This family overlaps with the first: when one of the two "factor" polygons is a square, the product is equivalent to a hyperprism whose base is a three-dimensional prism. The symmetry number of a duoprism whose factors are a p-gon and a q-gon (a "p,q-duoprism") is 4pq if p≠q; if the factors are both p-gons, the symmetry number is 8p^{2}. The tesseract can also be considered a 4,4-duoprism.

The elements of a p,q-duoprism (p ≥ 3, q ≥ 3) are:

- Cells: p q-gonal prisms, q p-gonal prisms
- Faces: pq squares, p q-gons, q p-gons
- Edges: 2pq
- Vertices: pq

There is no uniform analogue in four dimensions to the infinite family of three-dimensional antiprisms with the exception of the great duoantiprism.

Infinite set of p-q duoprism - - p q-gonal prisms, q p-gonal prisms:

- 3-3 duoprism - - 6 triangular prisms
- 3-4 duoprism - - 3 cubes, 4 triangular prisms
- 4-4 duoprism - - 8 cubes (same as tesseract)
- 3-5 duoprism - - 3 pentagonal prisms, 5 triangular prisms
- 4-5 duoprism - - 4 pentagonal prisms, 5 cubes
- 5-5 duoprism - - 10 pentagonal prisms
- 3-6 duoprism - - 3 hexagonal prisms, 6 triangular prisms
- 4-6 duoprism - - 4 hexagonal prisms, 6 cubes
- 5-6 duoprism - - 5 hexagonal prisms, 6 pentagonal prisms
- 6-6 duoprism - - 12 hexagonal prisms
- ...

== Polygonal prismatic prisms ==
The infinite set of uniform prismatic prisms overlaps with the 4-p duoprisms: (p≥3) - - p cubes and 4 p-gonal prisms - (All are the same as 4-p duoprism)

- Triangular prismatic prism - - 3 cubes and 4 triangular prisms - (same as 3-4 duoprism)
- Square prismatic prism - - 4 cubes and 4 cubes - (same as 4-4 duoprism and same as tesseract)
- Pentagonal prismatic prism - - 5 cubes and 4 pentagonal prisms - (same as 4-5 duoprism)
- Hexagonal prismatic prism - - 6 cubes and 4 hexagonal prisms - (same as 4-6 duoprism)
- Heptagonal prismatic prism - - 7 cubes and 4 heptagonal prisms - (same as 4-7 duoprism)
- Octagonal prismatic prism - - 8 cubes and 4 octagonal prisms - (same as 4-8 duoprism)
- ...

== Uniform antiprismatic prism ==
The infinite sets of uniform antiprismatic prisms or antiduoprisms are constructed from two parallel uniform antiprisms: (p≥3) - - 2 p-gonal antiprisms, connected by 2 p-gonal prisms and 2p triangular prisms.

Convex p-gonal antiprismatic prisms
Name	s{2,2}×{}	s{2,3}×{}	s{2,4}×{}	s{2,5}×{}	s{2,6}×{}	s{2,7}×{}	s{2,8}×{}	s{2,p}×{}
Coxeter diagram								
Image								
Vertex figure								
Cells	2 s{2,2} (2) {2}×{}={4} 4 {3}×{}	2 s{2,3} 2 {3}×{} 6 {3}×{}	2 s{2,4} 2 {4}×{} 8 {3}×{}	2 s{2,5} 2 {5}×{} 10 {3}×{}	2 s{2,6} 2 {6}×{} 12 {3}×{}	2 s{2,7} 2 {7}×{} 14 {3}×{}	2 s{2,8} 2 {8}×{} 16 {3}×{}	2 s{2,p} 2 {p}×{} 2p {3}×{}
Net								

A p-gonal antiprismatic prism has 4p triangle, 4p square and 4 p-gon faces. It has 10p edges, and 4p vertices.

Fundamental convex regular and uniform polytopes in dimensions 2–10
Family	A_{n}	B_{n}	I_{2}(p) / D_{n}	E_{6} / E_{7} / E_{8} / F_{4} / G_{2}	H_{n}
Regular polygon	Triangle	Square	p-gon	Hexagon	Pentagon
Uniform polyhedron	Tetrahedron	Octahedron • Cube	Demicube		Dodecahedron • Icosahedron
Uniform polychoron	Pentachoron	16-cell • Tesseract	Demitesseract	24-cell	120-cell • 600-cell
Uniform 5-polytope	5-simplex	5-orthoplex • 5-cube	5-demicube		
Uniform 6-polytope	6-simplex	6-orthoplex • 6-cube	6-demicube	1_{22} • 2_{21}	
Uniform 7-polytope	7-simplex	7-orthoplex • 7-cube	7-demicube	1_{32} • 2_{31} • 3_{21}	
Uniform 8-polytope	8-simplex	8-orthoplex • 8-cube	8-demicube	1_{42} • 2_{41} • 4_{21}	
Uniform 9-polytope	9-simplex	9-orthoplex • 9-cube	9-demicube		
Uniform 10-polytope	10-simplex	10-orthoplex • 10-cube	10-demicube		
Uniform n-polytope	n-simplex	n-orthoplex • n-cube	n-demicube	1_{k2} • 2_{k1} • k_{21}	n-pentagonal polytope
Topics: Polytope families • Regular polytope • List of regular polytopes and compounds • Polytope operations
