= Uniform antiprismatic prism =

4-D shape

Set of uniform antiprismatic prisms
Type	Prismatic uniform 4-polytope
Schläfli symbol	s{2,p}×{}
Coxeter diagram	
Cells	2 p-gonal antiprisms, 2 p-gonal prisms and 2p triangular prisms
Faces	4p {3}, 4p {4} and 4 {p}
Edges	10p
Vertices	4p
Vertex figure	Trapezoidal pyramid
Symmetry group	[2p,2^{+},2], order 8p [(p,2)^{+},2], order 4p
Properties	convex if the base is convex

In 4-dimensional geometry, a uniform antiprismatic prism or antiduoprism is a uniform 4-polytope with two uniform antiprism cells in two parallel 3-space hyperplanes, connected by uniform prisms cells between pairs of faces. The symmetry of a p-gonal antiprismatic prism is [2p,2^{+},2], order 8p.

A p-gonal antiprismatic prism or p-gonal antiduoprism has 2 p-gonal antiprism, 2 p-gonal prism, and 2p triangular prism cells. It has 4p equilateral triangle, 4p square and 4 regular p-gon faces. It has 10p edges, and 4p vertices.

Example 15-gonal antiprismatic prism
Schlegel diagram	Net

== Convex uniform antiprismatic prisms ==
There is an infinite series of convex uniform antiprismatic prisms, starting with the digonal antiprismatic prism is a tetrahedral prism, with two of the tetrahedral cells degenerated into squares. The triangular antiprismatic prism is the first nondegenerate form, which is also an octahedral prism. The remainder are unique uniform 4-polytopes.

Convex p-gonal antiprismatic prisms
Name	s{2,2}×{}	s{2,3}×{}	s{2,4}×{}	s{2,5}×{}	s{2,6}×{}	s{2,7}×{}	s{2,8}×{}	s{2,p}×{}
Coxeter diagram								
Image								
Vertex figure								
Cells	2 s{2,2} (2) {2}×{}={4} 4 {3}×{}	2 s{2,3} 2 {3}×{} 6 {3}×{}	2 s{2,4} 2 {4}×{} 8 {3}×{}	2 s{2,5} 2 {5}×{} 10 {3}×{}	2 s{2,6} 2 {6}×{} 12 {3}×{}	2 s{2,7} 2 {7}×{} 14 {3}×{}	2 s{2,8} 2 {8}×{} 16 {3}×{}	2 s{2,p} 2 {p}×{} 2p {3}×{}
Net								

== Star antiprismatic prisms ==
There are also star forms following the set of star antiprisms, starting with the pentagram {5/2}:

Name	Coxeter diagram	Cells	Image	Net (overlapping in space)
Pentagrammic antiprismatic prism 5/2 antiduoprism		2 pentagrammic antiprisms 2 pentagrammic prisms 10 triangular prisms		
Pentagrammic crossed antiprismatic prism 5/3 antiduoprism		2 pentagrammic crossed antiprisms 2 pentagrammic prisms 10 triangular prisms		
...				

== Square antiprismatic prism ==
Square antiprismatic prism
Type	Prismatic uniform 4-polytope
Schläfli symbol	s{2,4}x{}
Coxeter-Dynkin	
Cells	2 (3.3.3.4); 8 (3.4.4); 2 4.4.4
Faces	16 {3}, 20 {4}
Edges	40
Vertices	16
Vertex figure	Trapezoidal pyramid
Symmetry group	[(4,2)^{+},2], order 16 [8,2^{+},2], order 32
Properties	convex

A square antiprismatic prism or square antiduoprism is a convex uniform 4-polytope. It is formed as two parallel square antiprisms connected by cubes and triangular prisms. The symmetry of a square antiprismatic prism is [8,2^{+},2], order 32. It has 16 triangle, 16 square and 4 square faces. It has 40 edges, and 16 vertices.

Square antiprismatic prism
Schlegel diagram	Net

== Pentagonal antiprismatic prism ==
Pentagonal antiprismatic prism
Type	Prismatic uniform 4-polytope
Schläfli symbol	s{2,5}x{}
Coxeter-Dynkin	
Cells	2 (3.3.3.5); 10 (3.4.4); 2 (4.4.5)
Faces	20 {3}, 20 {4}, 4 {5}
Edges	50
Vertices	20
Vertex figure	Trapezoidal pyramid
Symmetry group	[(5,2)^{+},2], order 20 [10,2^{+},2], order 40
Properties	convex

A pentagonal antiprismatic prism or pentagonal antiduoprism is a convex uniform 4-polytope. It is formed as two parallel pentagonal antiprisms connected by cubes and triangular prisms. The symmetry of a pentagonal antiprismatic prism is [10,2^{+},2], order 40. It has 20 triangle, 20 square and 4 pentagonal faces. It has 50 edges, and 20 vertices.

Pentagonal antiprismatic prism
Schlegel diagram	Net

== Hexagonal antiprismatic prism ==
Hexagonal antiprismatic prism
Type	Prismatic uniform 4-polytope
Schläfli symbol	s{2,6}x{}
Coxeter-Dynkin	
Cells	2 (3.3.3.6); 12 (3.4.4); 2 (4.4.6)
Faces	24 {3}, 24 {4}, 4 {6}
Edges	60
Vertices	24
Vertex figure	Trapezoidal pyramid
Symmetry group	[(2,6)^{+},2], order 24 [12,2^{+},2], order 48
Properties	convex

A hexagonal antiprismatic prism or hexagonal antiduoprism is a convex uniform 4-polytope. It is formed as two parallel hexagonal antiprisms connected by cubes and triangular prisms. The symmetry of a hexagonal antiprismatic prism is [12,2^{+},2], order 48. It has 24 triangle, 24 square and 4 hexagon faces. It has 60 edges, and 24 vertices.

Hexagonal antiprismatic prism
Schlegel diagram	Net

== Heptagonal antiprismatic prism ==
Heptagonal antiprismatic prism
Type	Prismatic uniform 4-polytope
Schläfli symbol	s{2,7}×{}
Coxeter-Dynkin	
Cells	2 (3.3.3.7); 14 (3.4.4); 2 (4.4.7)
Faces	28 {3}, 28 {4}, 4 {7}
Edges	70
Vertices	28
Vertex figure	Trapezoidal pyramid
Symmetry group	[(7,2)^{+},2], order 28 [14,2^{+},2], order 56
Properties	convex

A heptagonal antiprismatic prism or heptagonal antiduoprism is a convex uniform 4-polytope. It is formed as two parallel heptagonal antiprisms connected by cubes and triangular prisms. The symmetry of a heptagonal antiprismatic prism is [14,2^{+},2], order 56. It has 28 triangle, 28 square and 4 heptagonal faces. It has 70 edges, and 28 vertices.

Heptagonal antiprismatic prism
Schlegel diagram	Net

== Octagonal antiprismatic prism ==
Octagonal antiprismatic prism
Type	Prismatic uniform 4-polytope
Schläfli symbol	s{2,8}×{}
Coxeter-Dynkin	
Cells	2 (3.3.3.8); 16 (3.4.4); 2 (4.4.8)
Faces	32 {3}, 32 {4}, 4 {8}
Edges	80
Vertices	32
Vertex figure	Trapezoidal pyramid
Symmetry group	[(8,2)^{+},2], order 32 [16,2^{+},2], order 64
Properties	convex

A octagonal antiprismatic prism or octagonal antiduoprism is a convex uniform 4-polytope (four-dimensional polytope). It is formed as two parallel octagonal antiprisms connected by cubes and triangular prisms. The symmetry of an octagonal antiprismatic prism is [16,2^{+},2], order 64. It has 32 triangle, 32 square and 4 octagonal faces. It has 80 edges, and 32 vertices.

Octagonal antiprismatic prism
Schlegel diagram	Net

== See also ==
- Duoprism
