= Tetradecahedron =

Polyhedron with 14 faces

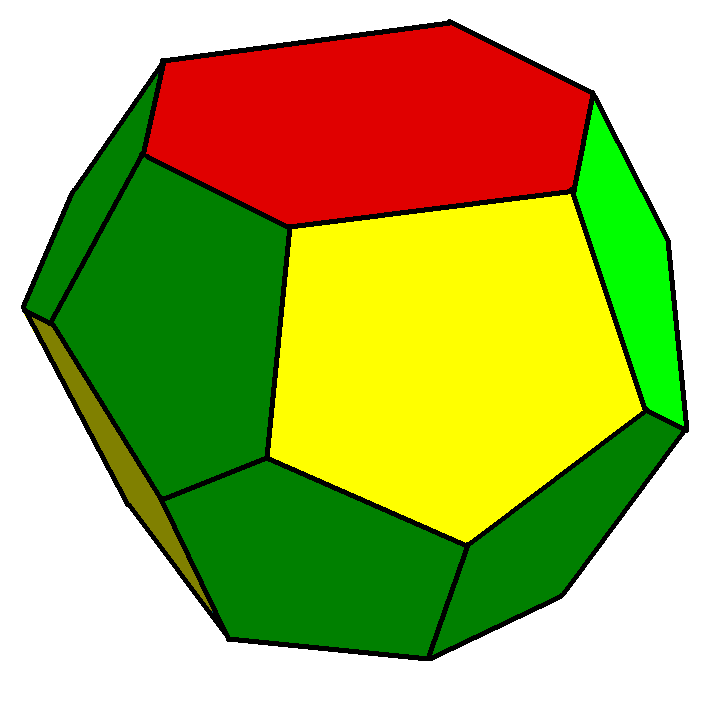
A tetradecahedron with D_{2d}-symmetry, existing in the Weaire–Phelan structure

A tetradecahedron is a polyhedron with 14 faces. There are numerous topologically distinct forms of a tetradecahedron, with many constructible entirely with regular polygon faces.

A tetradecahedron is sometimes called a tetrakaidecahedron. No difference in meaning is ascribed. The Greek word kai means 'and'. There is evidence that mammalian epidermal cells are shaped like flattened tetrakaidecahedra, an idea first suggested by Lord Kelvin. The polyhedron can also be found in soap bubbles and in sintered ceramics, due to its ability to tesselate in 3D space.

== Convex ==
There are 1,496,225,352 topologically distinct convex tetradecahedra, excluding mirror images, having at least 9 vertices. (Two polyhedra are "topologically distinct" if they have intrinsically different arrangements of faces and vertices, such that it is impossible to distort one into the other simply by changing the lengths of edges or the angles between edges or faces.)

== Examples ==
An incomplete list of forms includes:

Tetradecahedra having all regular polygonal faces (all exist in irregular-faced forms as well):

- Archimedean solids:
  - Cuboctahedron (8 triangles, 6 squares)
  - Truncated cube (8 triangles, 6 octagons)
  - Truncated octahedron (6 squares, 8 hexagons)
- Prisms and antiprisms:
  - Dodecagonal prism (12 squares, 2 dodecagons)
  - Hexagonal antiprism (12 triangles, 2 hexagons)
- Johnson solids:
  - J_{18}: Elongated triangular cupola (4 triangles, 9 squares, 1 hexagon)
  - J_{27}: Triangular orthobicupola (8 triangles, 6 squares)
  - J_{51}: Triaugmented triangular prism (14 triangles)
  - J_{55}: Parabiaugmented hexagonal prism (8 triangles, 4 squares, 2 hexagons)
  - J_{56}: Metabiaugmented hexagonal prism (8 triangles, 4 squares, 2 hexagons)
  - J_{65}: Augmented truncated tetrahedron (8 triangles, 3 squares, 3 hexagons)
  - J_{86}: Sphenocorona (12 triangles, 2 squares)
  - J_{91}: Bilunabirotunda (8 triangles, 2 squares, 4 pentagons)

Tetradecahedra having at least one irregular face:

- Heptagonal bipyramid (14 triangles) (see Dipyramid)
- Heptagonal trapezohedron (14 kites) (see Trapezohedron)
- Tridecagonal pyramid (13 triangles, 1 regular tridecagon) (see Pyramid (geometry))
- Dissected regular icosahedron (the vertex figure of the grand antiprism) (12 equilateral triangles and 2 trapezoids)
- Hexagonal truncated trapezohedron: (12 pentagons, 2 hexagons)
  Includes an optimal space-filling shape in foams (see Weaire–Phelan structure) and in the crystal structure of clathrate hydrate (see illustration, next to label 5^{12}6^{2})
- Hexagonal bifrustum (12 trapezoids, 2 hexagons)
- The British £1 coin in circulation from 2017 – with twelve edges and two faces – is an irregular dodecagonal prism, when one disregards the edging and relief features.

== See also ==
- Császár polyhedron – A nonconvex tetradecahedron of all triangle faces
- Steffen's polyhedron – A flexible tetradecahedron
- Permutohedron – A polyhedron that can be defined in any dimension and equals the truncated octahedron in three dimensions
