= Dodecagonal prism =

12-sided box

Uniform dodecagonal prism
Type	Prismatic uniform polyhedron
Elements	F = 14, E = 36, V = 24 (χ = 2)
Faces by sides	12{4}+2{12}
Schläfli symbol	t{2,12} or {12}×{}
Wythoff symbol	2 12 | 2; 2 2 6 |
Coxeter diagrams	
Symmetry	D_{12h}, [12,2], (*12.2.2), order 48
Rotation group	D_{12}, [12,2]^{+}, (12.2.2), order 24
References	U_{76(j)}
Dual	Dodecagonal dipyramid
Properties	convex, zonohedron
Vertex figure 4.4.12

3D model of a uniform dodecagonal prism

In geometry, the dodecagonal prism is the tenth in an infinite set of prisms, formed by square sides and two regular dodecagon caps.

If faces are all regular, it is a uniform polyhedron.

== Use ==
It is used in the construction of two prismatic uniform honeycombs:

Omnitruncated triangular-hexagonal prismatic honeycomb	Truncated hexagonal prismatic honeycomb

The new British one pound (£1) coin, which entered circulation in March 2017, is shaped like a dodecagonal prism.

== Related polyhedra ==
Family of uniform n-gonal prisms
Prism name	Digonal prism	(Trigonal) Triangular prism	(Tetragonal) Square prism	Pentagonal prism	Hexagonal prism	Heptagonal prism	Octagonal prism	Enneagonal prism	Decagonal prism	Hendecagonal prism	Dodecagonal prism	...	Apeirogonal prism
Polyhedron image												...	
Spherical tiling image												Plane tiling image	
Vertex config.	2.4.4	3.4.4	4.4.4	5.4.4	6.4.4	7.4.4	8.4.4	9.4.4	10.4.4	11.4.4	12.4.4	...	∞.4.4
Coxeter diagram												...	
