= Pentagonal antiprism =

Antiprism with a five-sided base

Uniform pentagonal antiprism
Type	Prismatic uniform polyhedron
Elements	F = 12, E = 20; V = 10 (χ = 2)
Faces by sides	10{3}+2{5}
Schläfli symbol	s{2,10} sr{2,5}
Wythoff symbol	| 2 2 5
Coxeter diagram	
Symmetry group	D_{5d}, [2^{+},10], (2*5), order 20
Rotation group	D_{5}, [5,2]^{+}, (522), order 10
References	U_{77(c)}
Dual	Pentagonal trapezohedron
Properties	convex
Vertex figure 3.3.3.5

3D model of a uniform pentagonal antiprism

In geometry, the pentagonal antiprism is the third in an infinite set of antiprisms formed by an even-numbered sequence of triangle sides closed by two polygon caps. It consists of two pentagons joined to each other by a ring of ten triangles for a total of twelve faces. Hence, it is a non-regular dodecahedron.

== Geometry ==
If the faces of the pentagonal antiprism are all regular, it is a semiregular polyhedron. It can also be considered as a parabidiminished icosahedron, a shape formed by removing two pentagonal pyramids from a regular icosahedron leaving two nonadjacent pentagonal faces; a related shape, the metabidiminished icosahedron (one of the Johnson solids), is likewise form from the icosahedron by removing two pyramids, but its pentagonal faces are adjacent to each other. The two pentagonal faces of either shape can be augmented with pyramids to form the icosahedron.

The semiregular pentagonal antiprism is inscribed in a cylinder whose bases are the disks in which the pentagonal faces are inscribed. If this polygon is projected radially onto a sphere and spherical trigonometry used to solve for the angular measures of the edges, the result is the arctangent of 2, matching the regular icosahedron; this implies that the radius of the cylinder equals its height.

=== Relation to polytopes ===
The pentagonal antiprism occurs as a constituent element in some higher-dimensional polytopes. Two rings of ten pentagonal antiprisms each bound the hypersurface of the four-dimensional grand antiprism. If these antiprisms are augmented with pentagonal prism pyramids and linked with rings of five tetrahedra each, the 600-cell is obtained.

== See also ==
The pentagonal antiprism can be truncated and alternated to form a snub antiprism:

Snub antiprisms
Antiprism A5	Truncated tA5	Alternated htA5
s{2,10}	ts{2,10}	ss{2,10}
v:10; e:20; f:12	v:40; e:60; f:22	v:20; e:50; f:32

Family of uniform n-gonal antiprisms
Antiprism name	Digonal antiprism	(Trigonal) Triangular antiprism	(Tetragonal) Square antiprism	Pentagonal antiprism	Hexagonal antiprism	Heptagonal antiprism	...	Apeirogonal antiprism
Polyhedron image							...	
Spherical tiling image							Plane tiling image	
Vertex config.	2.3.3.3	3.3.3.3	4.3.3.3	5.3.3.3	6.3.3.3	7.3.3.3	...	∞.3.3.3

== Crossed antiprism ==
A crossed pentagonal antiprism is topologically identical to the pentagonal antiprism, although it can't be made uniform. The sides are isosceles triangles. It has D_{5h} symmetry group of order 20. Its vertex configuration is 3.3/2.3.5, with one triangle retrograde and its vertex arrangement is the same as a pentagonal prism.

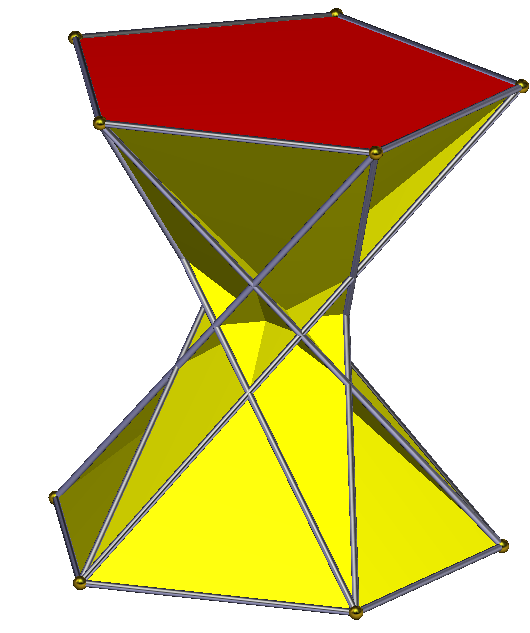
