= Heptagonal prism =

Prism with a 7-sided base

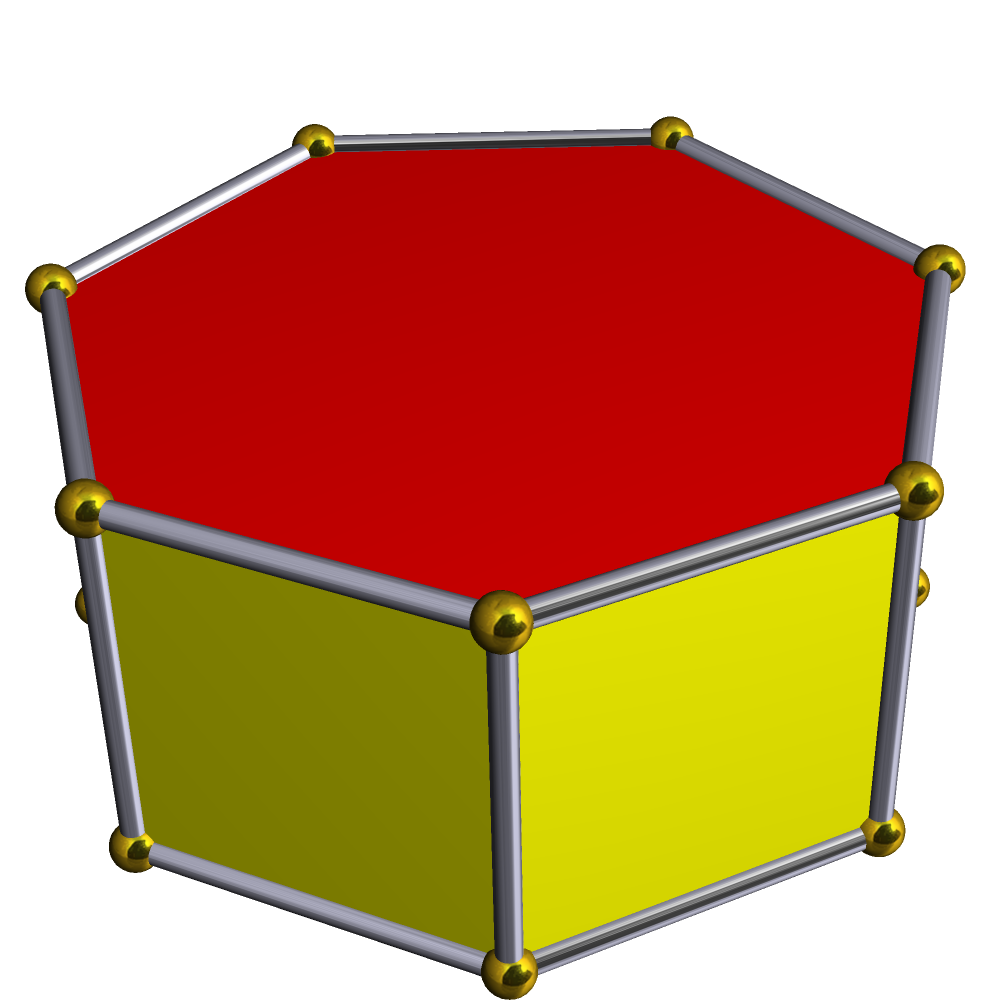
- Type: Uniform polyhedron
- Faces: 2 Heptagons; 7 squares
- Edges: 21
- Vertices: 14
- Vertex configuration: 7.4.4
- Wythoff symbol: 2 7 | 2
- Symmetry group: D_{7h}, [7,2], (*722), order 28
- Rotation group: D_{7}, [7,2]^{+}, (722), order 14
- Dual polyhedron: Heptagonal bipyramid
- Properties: Convex semiregular

Vertex figure
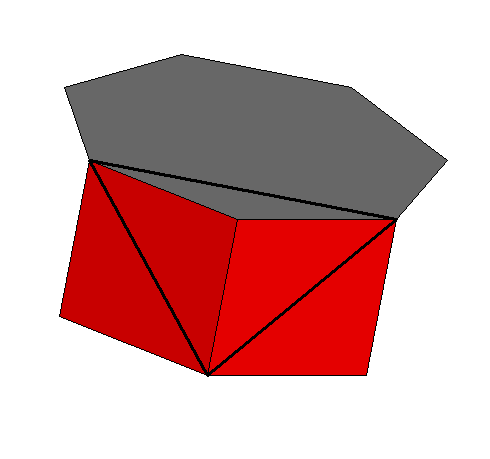

3D model of a uniform heptagonal prism

In geometry, the heptagonal prism is a prism with heptagonal base. This polyhedron has 9 faces (2 bases and 7 sides), 21 edges, and 14 vertices.

== Area ==
The area of a right heptagonal prism with height $h$ and with a side length of $L$ and apothem $a_p$ is given by:

$$A = 7L\cdot (a_p + h)$$

== Volume ==
The volume is found by taking the area of the base, with a side length of $L$ and apothem $a_p$, and multiplying it by the height $h$, giving the formula:

$$V = \frac{7}{2}\cdot h\cdot L\cdot a_p$$

This formula also works for the oblique prism due to the Cavalieri's principle.

== Images ==
The heptagonal prism can also be seen as a tiling on a sphere:

== Related polyhedra ==
Family of uniform n-gonal prisms
Prism name	Digonal prism	(Trigonal) Triangular prism	(Tetragonal) Square prism	Pentagonal prism	Hexagonal prism	Heptagonal prism	Octagonal prism	Enneagonal prism	Decagonal prism	Hendecagonal prism	Dodecagonal prism	...	Apeirogonal prism
Polyhedron image												...	
Spherical tiling image												Plane tiling image	
Vertex config.	2.4.4	3.4.4	4.4.4	5.4.4	6.4.4	7.4.4	8.4.4	9.4.4	10.4.4	11.4.4	12.4.4	...	∞.4.4
Coxeter diagram												...	
