= Octagonal prism =

Prism with an 8-sided base

Uniform octagonal prism
Type	Prismatic uniform polyhedron
Elements	F = 10, E = 24, V = 16 (χ = 2)
Faces by sides	8{4}+2{8}
Schläfli symbol	t{2,8} or {8}×{}
Wythoff symbol	2 8 | 2; 2 2 4 |
Coxeter diagrams	
Symmetry	D_{8h}, [8,2], (*822), order 32
Rotation group	D_{8}, [8,2]^{+}, (822), order 16
References	U_{76(f)}
Dual	Octagonal dipyramid
Properties	convex, zonohedron
Vertex figure 4.4.8

3D model of a uniform octagonal prism

In geometry, the octagonal prism is a prism comprising eight rectangular sides joining two regular octagon caps.

== Symmetry ==
Name	Ditetragonal prism	Ditetragonal trapezoprism
Image		
Symmetry	D_{4h}, [2,4], (*422)	D_{4d}, [2^{+},8], (2*4)
Construction	tr{4,2} or t{4}×{},	s_{2}{2,8},

== Images ==
The octagonal prism can also be seen as a tiling on a sphere:

== Use ==
In optics, octagonal prisms are used to generate flicker-free images in movie projectors.

== In uniform honeycombs and 4-polytopes ==
It is an element of three uniform honeycombs:

Truncated square prismatic honeycomb	Omnitruncated cubic honeycomb	Runcitruncated cubic honeycomb

It is also an element of two four-dimensional uniform 4-polytopes:

Runcitruncated tesseract	Omnitruncated tesseract

== Related polyhedra ==
Family of uniform n-gonal prisms
Prism name	Digonal prism	(Trigonal) Triangular prism	(Tetragonal) Square prism	Pentagonal prism	Hexagonal prism	Heptagonal prism	Octagonal prism	Enneagonal prism	Decagonal prism	Hendecagonal prism	Dodecagonal prism	...	Apeirogonal prism
Polyhedron image												...	
Spherical tiling image												Plane tiling image	
Vertex config.	2.4.4	3.4.4	4.4.4	5.4.4	6.4.4	7.4.4	8.4.4	9.4.4	10.4.4	11.4.4	12.4.4	...	∞.4.4
Coxeter diagram												...	

*n42 symmetry mutation of omnitruncated tilings: 4.8.2n
Symmetry *n42 [n,4]	Spherical		Euclidean	Compact hyperbolic				Paracomp.
Symmetry *n42 [n,4]	*242 [2,4]	*342 [3,4]	*442 [4,4]	*542 [5,4]	*642 [6,4]	*742 [7,4]	*842 [8,4]...	*∞42 [∞,4]
Omnitruncated figure	4.8.4	4.8.6	4.8.8	4.8.10	4.8.12	4.8.14	4.8.16	4.8.∞
Omnitruncated duals	V4.8.4	V4.8.6	V4.8.8	V4.8.10	V4.8.12	V4.8.14	V4.8.16	V4.8.∞
