= Pentagonal prism =

Prism with a 5-sided base

Uniform pentagonal prism
Type	Prismatic uniform polyhedron
Elements	F = 7, E = 15; V = 10 (χ = 2)
Faces by sides	5{4}+2{5}
Schläfli symbol	t{2,5} or {5}×{}
Wythoff symbol	2 5 | 2
Coxeter diagram	
Symmetry group	D_{5h}, [5,2], (*522), order 20
Rotation group	D_{5}, [5,2]^{+}, (522), order 10
References	U_{76(c)}
Dual	Pentagonal dipyramid
Properties	convex
Vertex figure 4.4.5

3D model of a uniform pentagonal prism

In geometry, the pentagonal prism is a prism with a pentagonal base. It is a type of heptahedron with seven faces, fifteen edges, and ten vertices.

== As a semiregular (or uniform) polyhedron ==
If faces are all regular, the pentagonal prism is a semiregular polyhedron, more generally, a uniform polyhedron, and the third in an infinite set of prisms formed by square sides and two regular polygon caps. It can be seen as a truncated pentagonal hosohedron, represented by Schläfli symbol t{2,5}. Alternately it can be seen as the Cartesian product of a regular pentagon and a line segment, and represented by the product {5}×{}. The dual of a pentagonal prism is a pentagonal bipyramid.

The symmetry group of a right pentagonal prism is D_{5h} of order 20. The rotation group is D_{5} of order 10.

== Volume ==
The volume, as for all prisms, is the product of the area of the pentagonal base times the height or distance along any edge perpendicular to the base. For a uniform pentagonal prism with edges h the formula is

$$\frac{h^3}{4}\sqrt{5(5 + 2\sqrt{5})} \approx 1.72h^3$$

== Use ==
Nonuniform pentagonal prisms called pentaprisms are also used in optics to rotate an image through a right angle without changing its chirality.

=== In 4-polytopes ===
It exists as cells of four nonprismatic uniform 4-polytopes in four dimensions:

cantellated 600-cell	cantitruncated 600-cell	runcinated 600-cell	runcitruncated 600-cell

== Related polyhedra ==
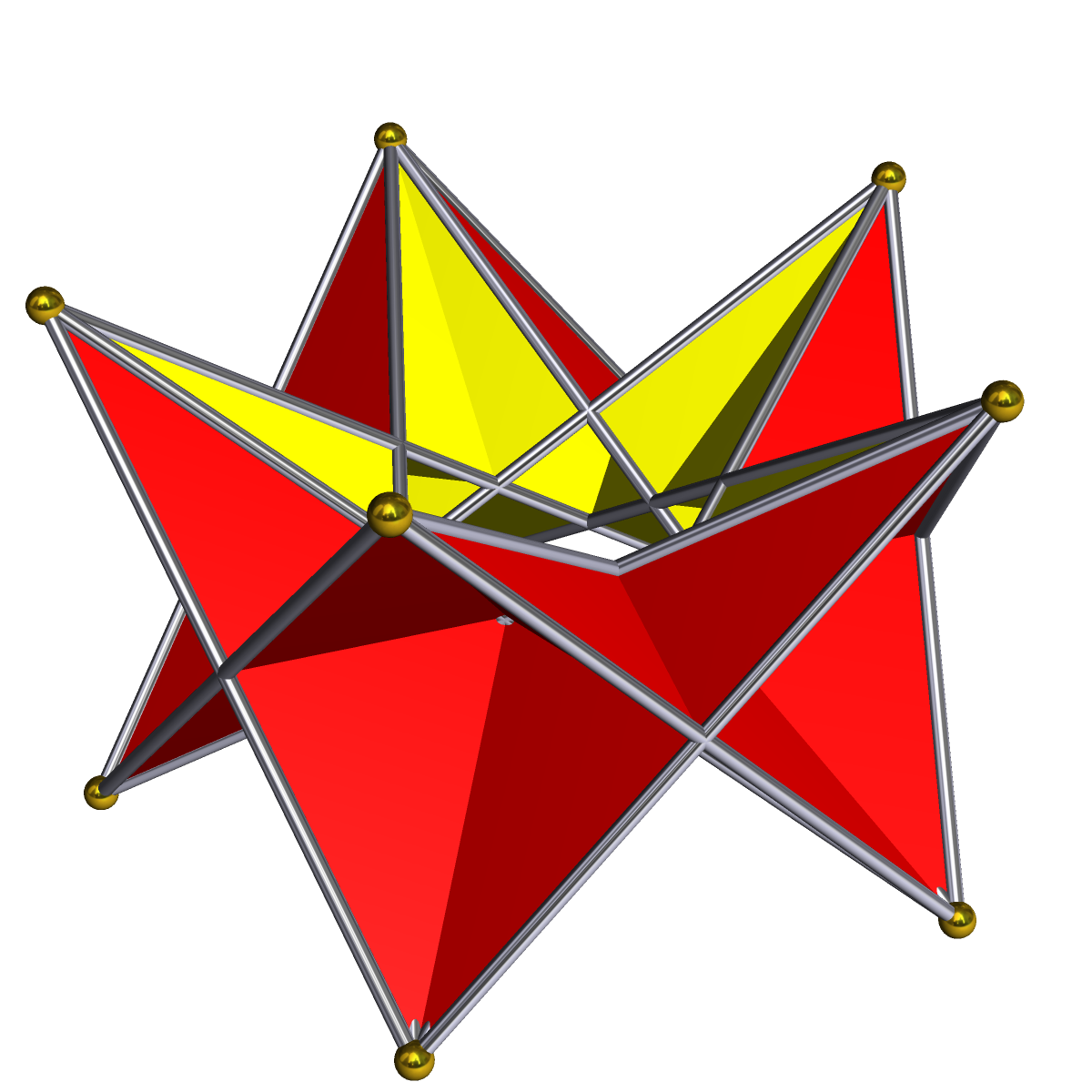
The pentagonal stephanoid has pentagonal dihedral symmetry and has the same vertices as the uniform pentagonal prism.

Family of uniform n-gonal prisms
Prism name	Digonal prism	(Trigonal) Triangular prism	(Tetragonal) Square prism	Pentagonal prism	Hexagonal prism	Heptagonal prism	Octagonal prism	Enneagonal prism	Decagonal prism	Hendecagonal prism	Dodecagonal prism	...	Apeirogonal prism
Polyhedron image												...	
Spherical tiling image												Plane tiling image	
Vertex config.	2.4.4	3.4.4	4.4.4	5.4.4	6.4.4	7.4.4	8.4.4	9.4.4	10.4.4	11.4.4	12.4.4	...	∞.4.4
Coxeter diagram												...	
