= Heptagonal antiprism =

Uniform heptagonal antiprism
Type	Prismatic uniform polyhedron
Elements	F = 16, E = 28; V = 14 (χ = 2)
Faces by sides	14{3}+2{7}
Schläfli symbol	s{2,14} sr{2,7}
Wythoff symbol	| 2 2 7
Coxeter diagram	
Symmetry group	D_{7d}, [2^{+},14], (2*7), order 28
Rotation group	D_{7}, [7,2]^{+}, (722), order 14
References	U_{77(e)}
Dual	Heptagonal trapezohedron
Properties	convex
Vertex figure 3.3.3.7

In geometry, the heptagonal antiprism is the fifth in an infinite set of antiprisms formed by two parallel polygons separated by a strip of triangles. In the case of the heptagonal antiprism, the caps are two regular heptagons. Consequently, this polyhedron features 14 vertices and 14 equilateral triangular faces. There are 14 edges where a triangle meets a heptagon, and an additional 14 edges where two triangles meet.

The heptagonal antiprism was first illustrated by Johannes Kepler as an example of the general construction of antiprisms.

3D model of a uniform heptagonal antiprism
