= Square antiprism =

Solid with 10 faces

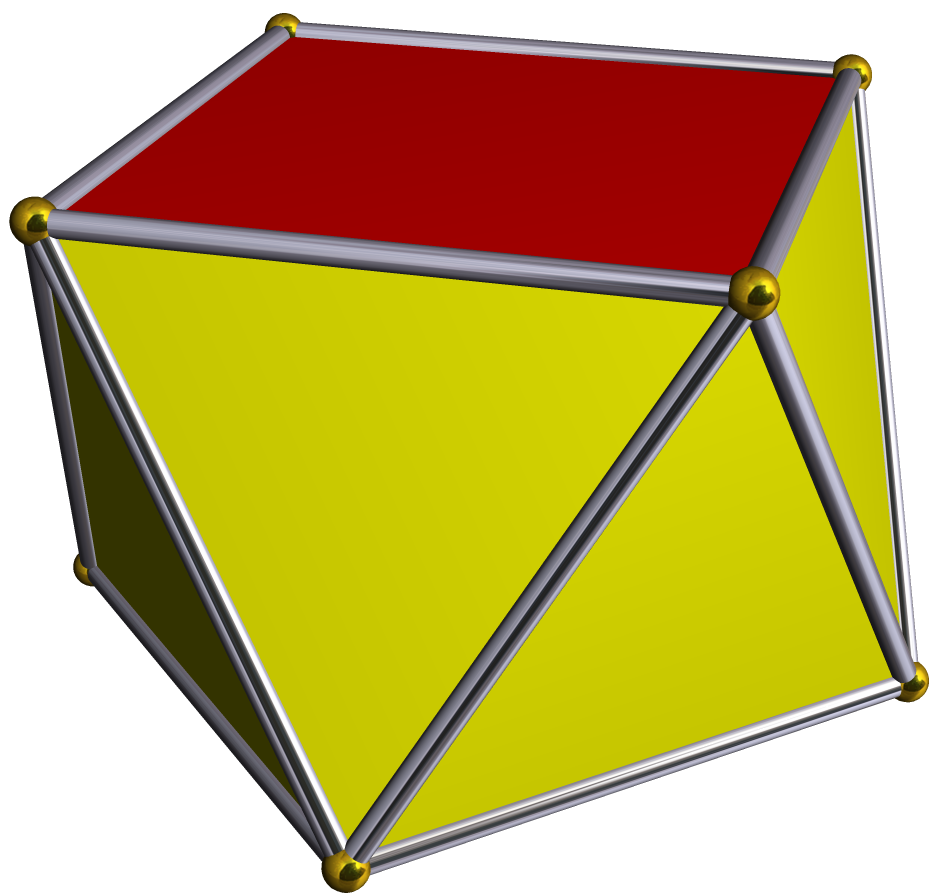
- Type: prismatic uniform polyhedron
- Faces: 10
- Edges: 16
- Vertices: 8
- Symmetry group: antiprismatic symmetry $\mathrm{D}_{4\mathrm{d}}$
- Dual polyhedron: tetragonal trapezohedron
- Properties: convex

In geometry, the square antiprism is the second in an infinite family of antiprisms formed by an even-numbered sequence of triangle sides closed by two polygon caps. It is also known as an anticube.

If all its faces are regular, it is a semiregular polyhedron or uniform polyhedron.

A nonuniform D_{4}-symmetric variant is the cell of the noble square antiprismatic 72-cell.

== Description ==
A square antiprism is a polyhedron with two square bases, one of which is rotated 45 degrees relative to the other. The square bases connect each other by pairing two vertices with an edge, forming an alternating band of triangles. As a result, there are 10 faces (eight triangles and two squares), 16 edges, and 8 vertices.

Given that $h$ and $\ell$ are the height and an edge length of an $n$-sided polygonal antiprism, respectively, the volume is formulated as:
$$V = \frac{hn\ell^2}{12} \left(\cot \frac{\pi}{n} + 4 \cot \frac{\pi}{2n} \right).$$
In the case of a square antiprism $n = 4$, the volume becomes:
$$V_\text{square} = \frac{h\ell^2}{3} \left(5 + 4 \sqrt{2}\right).$$

=== As a uniform antiprism ===
3D model of a uniform square antiprism

If the edges are equal in length, so that the triangles become equilateral triangles, the square antiprism is a uniform polyhedron, where any two vertices of it are mapping to each other, a vertex-transitive property. Such a square antiprism has a three-dimensional point group, the antiprismatic symmetry $D_{4\mathrm{d}}$ of order 16: an eight-fold axis of rotation passing through the bases' centroid, four two-fold axes perpendicularly pass through two opposite triangular faces, and four diagonal mirror symmetry planes passing through a pair of two opposite vertices of a square base.

The uniform square antiprism is an elementary polyhedron, meaning that it cannot be sliced by a plane to produce any convex, regular-faced polyhedra. However, when such an antiprism is attached to other elementaries, the resulting polyhedra become composites. Several examples are the Johnson solids, named after American mathematician Norman W. Johnson who listed 92 convex polyhedra with regular polygonal faces: gyroelongated square pyramid $J_{10}$ and gyroelongated square bipyramid $J_{17}$ by equilateral square pyramids $J_1$. However, not all Johnson solids are composite but remain constructable by the adjustment of the square antiprism itself; for instances, the snub square antiprism $J_{85}$ where a chain of equilateral triangles inserted around the middle.

== Applications ==
=== Architecture ===
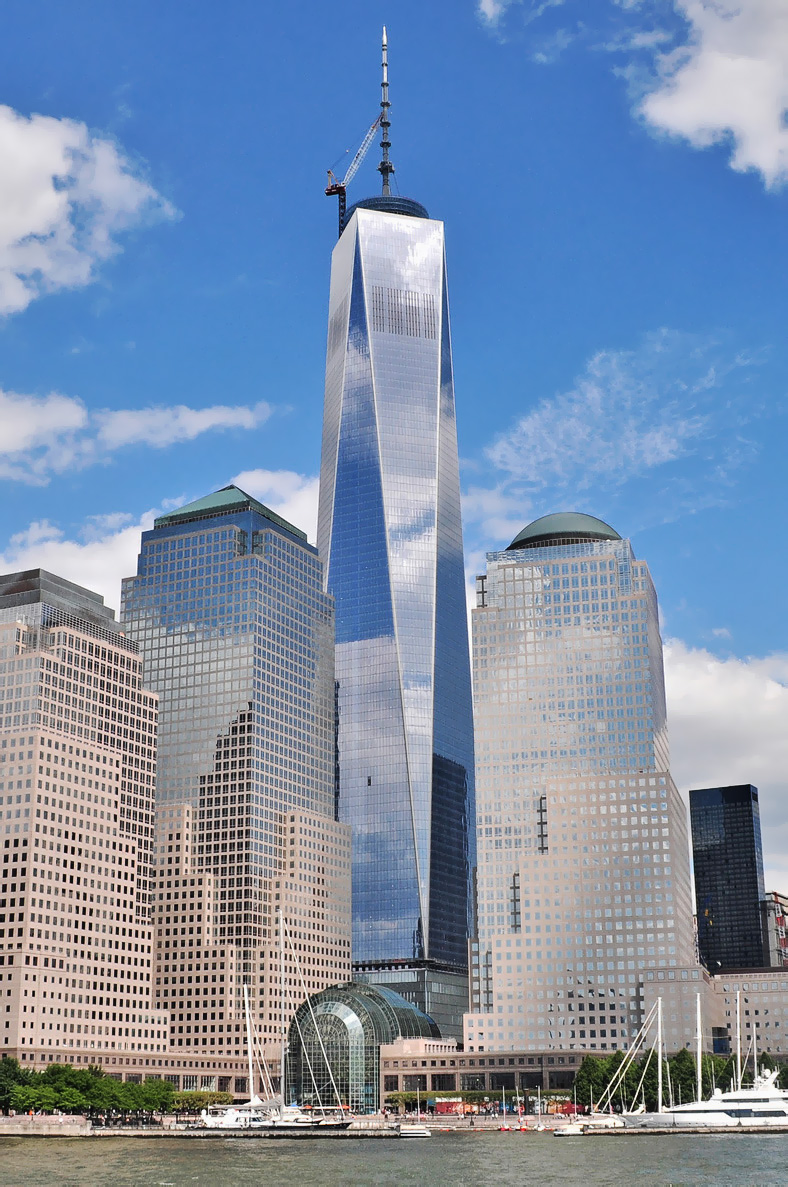
One World Trade Center building

The main building block of the One World Trade Center has the shape of an extremely tall tapering square antiprism. It is not a true antiprism because of its taper: the top square has half the area of the bottom one.

=== Points on a sphere ===
When eight points are distributed on the surface of a sphere with the aim of maximising the distance between them in some sense, the resulting shape corresponds to a square antiprism rather than a cube. Specific methods of distributing the points include, for example, the Thomson problem (minimising the sum of all the reciprocals of distances between points), maximising the distance of each point to the nearest point, or minimising the sum of all reciprocals of squares of distances between points.

=== Molecules with square antiprismatic geometry ===
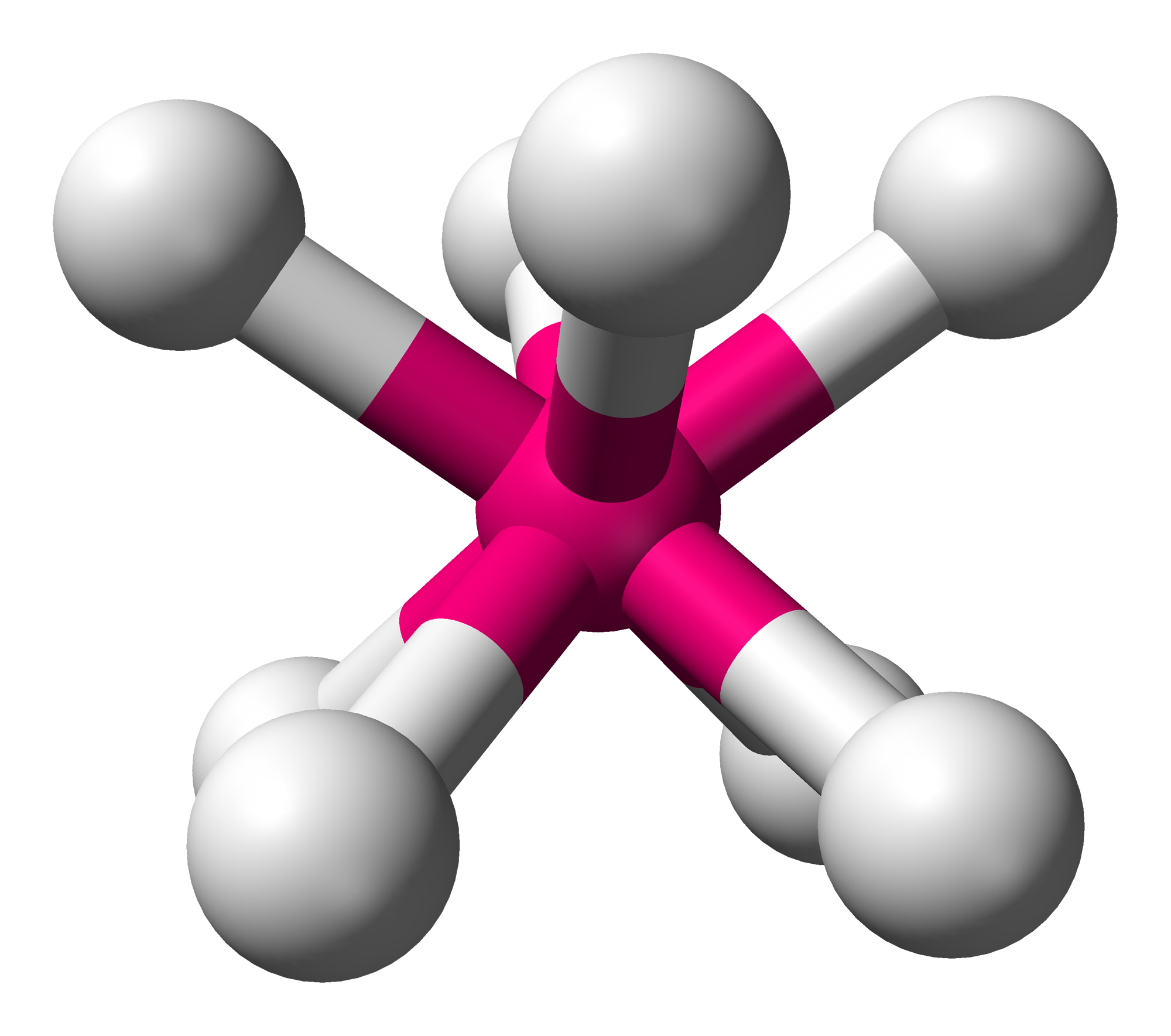
Square antiprismatic molecular geometry

According to the VSEPR theory of molecular geometry in chemistry, which is based on the general principle of maximising the distances between points, a square antiprism is the favoured geometry when eight pairs of electrons surround a central atom. One molecule with this geometry is the octafluoroxenate(VI) ion (XeF^{2−}_{8}) in the salt nitrosonium octafluoroxenate(VI) (NO)_{2}XeF_{8}; however, the molecule is distorted away from the idealized square antiprism. Very few ions are cubical because such a shape would cause large repulsion between ligands; PaF^{3−}_{8} is one of the few examples.

In addition, the element sulfur forms octatomic S_{8} molecules as its most stable allotrope. The S_{8} molecule has a structure based on the square antiprism, in which the eight atoms occupy the eight vertices of the antiprism, and the eight triangle-triangle edges of the antiprism correspond to single covalent bonds between sulfur atoms.

== Topologically identical polyhedra ==
=== Twisted prism ===
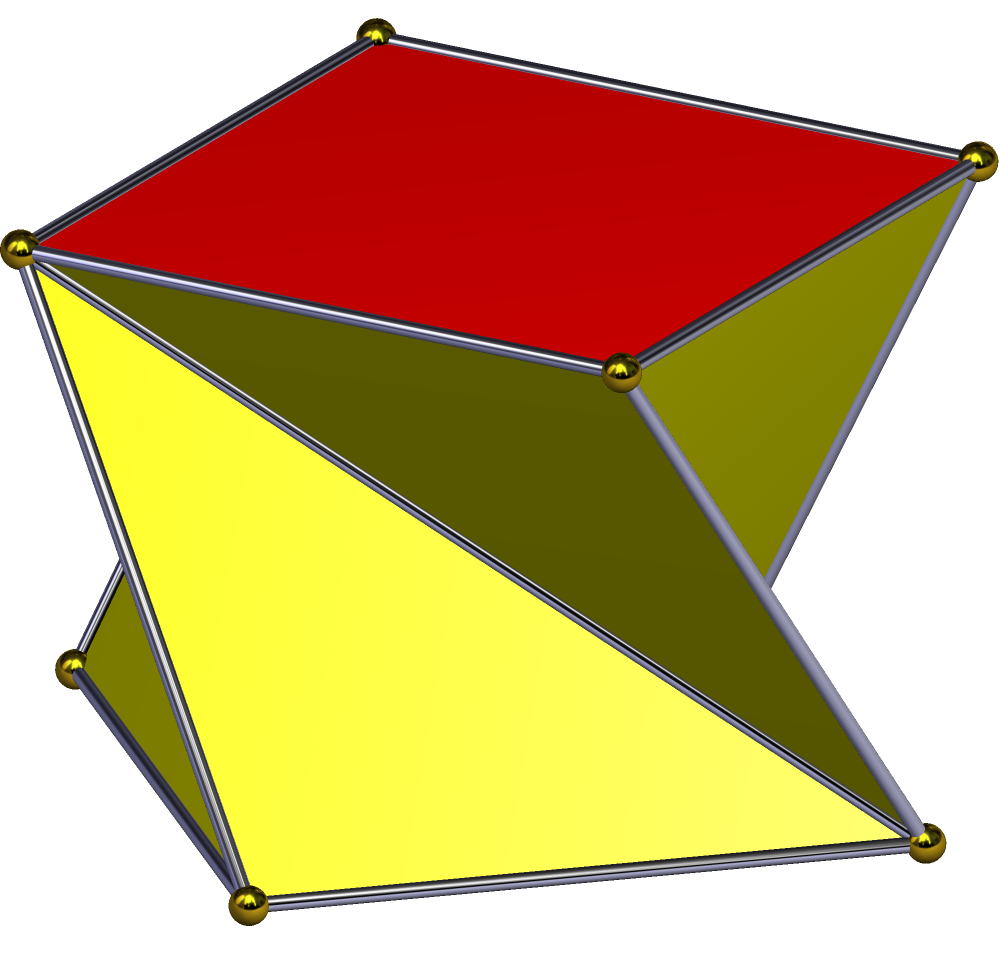
Twisted prism

A twisted prism can be made (clockwise or counterclockwise) with the same vertex arrangement. It can be seen as the convex form with 4 tetrahedrons excavated around the sides. However, after this it can no longer be triangulated into tetrahedra without adding new vertices. It has half of the symmetry of the uniform solution: D_{4} group of order 8.

=== Crossed antiprism ===
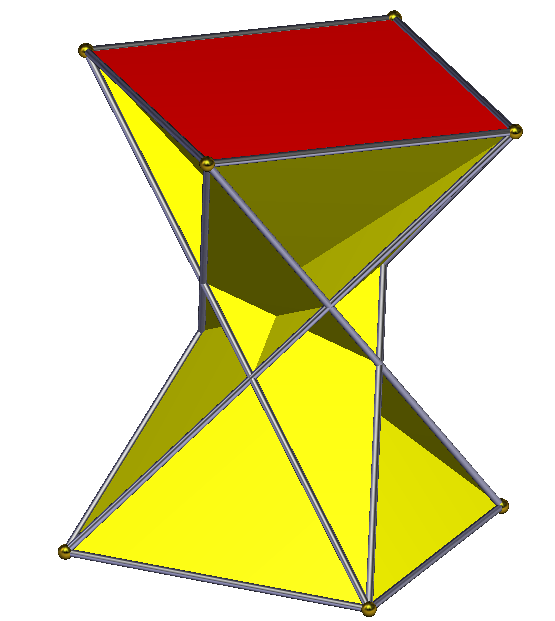
Crossed antiprism

A crossed square antiprism is a star polyhedron, topologically identical to the square antiprism with the same vertex arrangement, but it cannot be made uniform; the sides are isosceles triangles. Its vertex configuration is 3.3/2.3.4, with one triangle retrograde. It has D_{4d} symmetry group of order 16.

== Euclidean geometry ==
If $a$ denotes the side length of each of the two squares, and $h$ the (vertical) distance between the two squares, one can embed the 8 corners into Euclidean geometry by placing the 4 corners of the top square at Cartesian coordinates $(\pm a/2, \pm a/2, h/2)$ and the 4 corners of the bottom square—rotated by 45 degrees around the vertical axis relative to the top square—at $(\pm a/\surd 2 ,0,-h/2)$ and $(0,\pm a/\surd 2,-h/2)$.

The distance of each of these 8 corners to the center of coordinates is $\sqrt{2a^2+h^2}/2$.

If the length of the edges of the 8 triangular sides are isosceles, also equal to $a$, $h$ must be set to $h=a/\sqrt[4]{2}$, and the antiprism is equilateral. The distance of each of the 8 corners to the center of coordinates then is the radius of the circumsphere, $r= \sqrt{8+2^{3/2}}a/4\approx 0.82266 a$. By building dot products between vectors from the center to pairs of corners one finds that the smallest angle $\phi$ at which edges appear from the center is $\cos\phi = 1/(1+2^{3/2})$, which gives $\phi\approx 1.30652 \approx 74.858^\circ$. (This is the analog to the tetrahedral bond angle of the regular tetrahedron.)

== See also ==
- Biscornu
