= Prism (geometry) =

Solid with 2 parallel n-gonal bases connected by n parallelograms

Set of uniform n-gonal prisms
- Example: uniform hexagonal prism (n = 6)
- Type: uniform in the sense of semiregular polyhedron
- Faces: 2 n-sided regular polygons n squares
- Edges: 3n
- Vertices: 2n
- Euler char.: 2
- Vertex configuration: 4.4.n
- Schläfli symbol: {n}×{ } t{2,n}
- Conway notation: Pn
- Symmetry group: D_{nh}, [n,2], (*n22), order 4n
- Rotation group: D_{n}, [n,2]^{+}, (n22), order 2n
- Dual polyhedron: convex dual-uniform n-gonal bipyramid
- Properties: convex, regular polygon faces, isogonal, translated bases, sides ⊥ bases

Net
- Example: net of uniform enneagonal prism (n = 9)

In geometry, a prism is a polyhedron comprising an n-sided polygon base, a second base which is a translated copy (rigidly moved without rotation) of the first, and n other faces, necessarily all parallelograms, joining corresponding sides of the two bases. All cross-sections parallel to the bases are translations of the bases. Prisms are named after their bases, e.g. a prism with a pentagonal base is called a pentagonal prism. Prisms are a subclass of prismatoids.

Like many basic geometric terms, the word prism (from Greek πρίσμα (prisma) 'something sawed') was first used in Euclid's Elements. Euclid defined the term in Book XI as "a solid figure contained by two opposite, equal and parallel planes, while the rest are parallelograms". However, this definition has been criticized for not being specific enough in regard to the nature of the bases (a cause of some confusion amongst generations of later geometry writers).

== Oblique vs right ==
An oblique prism is a prism in which the joining edges and faces are not perpendicular to the base faces.

Example: a parallelepiped is an oblique prism whose base is a parallelogram, or equivalently a polyhedron with six parallelogram faces.

Right prism

A right prism is a prism in which the joining edges and faces are perpendicular to the base faces. This applies if and only if all the joining faces are rectangular.

The dual of a right n-prism is a right n-bipyramid.

A right prism (with rectangular sides) with regular n-gon bases has Schläfli symbol { }×{n}. It approaches a cylinder as n approaches infinity.

=== Special cases ===
- A right rectangular prism (with a rectangular base) is also called a cuboid, or informally a rectangular box. A right rectangular prism has Schläfli symbol { }×{ }×{ }.
- A right square prism (with a square base) is also called a square cuboid, or informally a square box.

Note: some texts may apply the term rectangular prism or square prism to both a right rectangular-based prism and a right square-based prism.

== Types ==
=== Regular prism ===
A regular prism is a prism with regular bases.

=== Uniform prism ===
A uniform prism or semiregular prism is a right prism with regular bases and all edges of the same length.

Thus all the side faces of a uniform prism are squares.

Thus all the faces of a uniform prism are regular polygons. Also, such prisms are isogonal; thus they are uniform polyhedra. They form one of the two infinite series of semiregular polyhedra, the other series being formed by the antiprisms.

A uniform n-gonal prism has Schläfli symbol t{2,n}.

Family of uniform n-gonal prisms
Prism name	Digonal prism	(Trigonal) Triangular prism	(Tetragonal) Square prism	Pentagonal prism	Hexagonal prism	Heptagonal prism	Octagonal prism	Enneagonal prism	Decagonal prism	Hendecagonal prism	Dodecagonal prism	...	Apeirogonal prism
Polyhedron image												...	
Spherical tiling image												Plane tiling image	
Vertex config.	2.4.4	3.4.4	4.4.4	5.4.4	6.4.4	7.4.4	8.4.4	9.4.4	10.4.4	11.4.4	12.4.4	...	∞.4.4
Coxeter diagram												...	

== Properties ==
=== Volume ===
The volume of a prism is the product of the area of the base by the height, i.e. the distance between the two base faces (in the case of a non-right prism, note that this means the perpendicular distance).

The volume is therefore:

$$V = Bh,$$

where B is the base area and h is the height.

The volume of a prism whose base is an n-sided regular polygon with side length s is therefore:
$$V = \frac{n}{4} h s^2 \cot\frac{\pi}{n}.$$

=== Surface area ===
The surface area of a right prism is:

$$2B + Ph,$$

where B is the area of the base, h the height, and P the base perimeter.

The surface area of a right prism whose base is a regular n-sided polygon with side length s, and with height h, is therefore:

$$A = \frac{n}{2} s^2 \cot\frac{\pi}{n} + nsh.$$

=== Symmetry ===
The symmetry group of a right n-sided prism with regular base is D_{nh} of order 4n, except in the case of a cube, which has the larger symmetry group O_{h} of order 48, which has three versions of D_{4h} as subgroups. The rotation group is D_{n} of order 2n, except in the case of a cube, which has the larger symmetry group O of order 24, which has three versions of D_{4} as subgroups.

The symmetry group D_{nh} contains inversion iff n is even.

The hosohedra and dihedra also possess dihedral symmetry, and an n-gonal prism can be constructed via the geometrical truncation of an n-gonal hosohedron, as well as through the cantellation or expansion of an n-gonal dihedron.

=== Schlegel diagrams ===
P3	P4	P5	P6	P7	P8

== Similar polytopes ==
=== Truncated prism ===
Example of a truncated triangular prism. Its top face is truncated at an oblique angle, but it is not an oblique prism.

A truncated prism is formed when prism is sliced by a plane that is not parallel to its bases. A truncated prism's bases are not congruent, and its sides are not parallelograms.

=== Twisted prism ===
A twisted prism is a nonconvex polyhedron constructed from a uniform n-prism with each side face bisected on the square diagonal, by twisting the top, usually (but not necessarily) by π/n radians (180/n degrees). If the bisectors are slanted to the left, then twisting the top base in the right direction (looking at the top of the prism) by a small angle gives nonconvex polyhedron and twisting it in the left direction, a convex polyhedron (see twisted square prism on the image). If the bisectors are slanted to the right, then twisting the top base in the left direction gives nonconvex polyhedron, in the right direction, convex one (see twisted dodecagonal prism).

A twisted prism cannot be dissected into tetrahedra without adding new vertices. The simplest twisted prism has triangle bases and is called a Schönhardt polyhedron.

An n-gonal twisted prism is topologically identical to the n-gonal uniform antiprism, but has half the symmetry group: D_{n}, [n,2]^{+}, order 2n. It can be seen as a nonconvex antiprism, with tetrahedra removed between pairs of triangles. Any twisted n-gonal prism is an antiprism, so the twisted square prism and twisted dodecagonal prism shown on the image are both antiprisms.

3-gonal	4-gonal		12-gonal
Schönhardt polyhedron	Twisted square prism	Square antiprism	Twisted dodecagonal prism

=== Frustum ===
A frustum is a similar construction to a prism, with trapezoid lateral faces and differently sized top and bottom polygons.

Example pentagonal frustum

=== Star prism ===
A star prism is a nonconvex polyhedron constructed by two identical star polygon faces on the top and bottom, being parallel and offset by a distance and connected by rectangular faces. A uniform star prism will have Schläfli symbol {p/q} × { }, with p rectangles and 2 {p/q} faces. It is topologically identical to a p-gonal prism.

Examples
{ }×{ }_{180}×{ }	t_{a}{3}×{ }	{5/2}×{ }	{7/2}×{ }	{7/3}×{ }	{8/3}×{ }
D_{2h}, order 8	D_{3h}, order 12	D_{5h}, order 20	D_{7h}, order 28		D_{8h}, order 32

=== Crossed prism ===
A crossed prism is a nonconvex polyhedron constructed from a prism, where the vertices of one base are inverted around the center of this base (or rotated by 180°). This transforms the side rectangular faces into crossed rectangles. For a regular polygon base, the appearance is an n-gonal hour glass. All oblique edges pass through a single body center. Note: no vertex is at this body centre. A crossed prism is topologically identical to an n-gonal prism.

Examples
{ }×{ }_{180}×{ }_{180}	t_{a}{3}×{ }_{180}	{3}×{ }_{180}	{4}×{ }_{180}	{5}×{ }_{180}	{5/2}×{ }_{180}	{6}×{ }_{180}
D_{2h}, order 8	D_{3d}, order 12		D_{4h}, order 16	D_{5d}, order 20		D_{6d}, order 24

=== Toroidal prism ===
A toroidal prism is a nonconvex polyhedron like a crossed prism, but without bottom and top base faces, and with simple rectangular side faces closing the polyhedron. This can only be done for even-sided base polygons. These are topological tori, with Euler characteristic of zero. The topological polyhedral net can be cut from two rows of a square tiling (with vertex configuration 4.4.4.4): a band of n squares, each attached to a crossed rectangle. An n-gonal toroidal prism has 2n vertices, 2n faces: n squares and n crossed rectangles, and 4n edges. It is topologically self-dual.

Examples
D_{4h}, order 16	D_{6h}, order 24
V = 8, E = 16, F = 8	V = 12, E = 24, F = 12

=== Prismatic polytope ===
A prismatic polytope is a higher-dimensional generalization of a prism. An n-dimensional prismatic polytope is constructed from two (n − 1)-dimensional polytopes, translated into the next dimension.

The prismatic n-polytope elements are doubled from the (n − 1)-polytope elements and then creating new elements from the next lower element.

Take an n-polytope with F_{i} i-face elements (i = 0, ..., n). Its (n + 1)-polytope prism will have 2F_{i} + F_{i−1} i-face elements. (With F_{−1} = 0, F_{n} = 1.)

By dimension:

- Take a polygon with n vertices, n edges. Its prism has 2n vertices, 3n edges, and 2 + n faces.
- Take a polyhedron with V vertices, E edges, and F faces. Its prism has 2V vertices, 2E + V edges, 2F + E faces, and 2 + F cells.
- Take a polychoron with V vertices, E edges, F faces, and C cells. Its prism has 2V vertices, 2E + V edges, 2F + E faces, 2C + F cells, and 2 + C hypercells.

=== Uniform prismatic polytope ===
A regular n-polytope represented by Schläfli symbol {p,q,...,t} can form a uniform prismatic (n + 1)-polytope represented by a Cartesian product of two Schläfli symbols: {p,q,...,t}×{ }.

By dimension:

- A 0-polytopic prism is a line segment, represented by an empty Schläfli symbol { }.
- A 1-polytopic prism is a rectangle, made from 2 translated line segments. It is represented as the product Schläfli symbol { }×{ }. If it is square, symmetry can be reduced: { }×{ } = {4}.
  Example: , Square, { }×{ }, two parallel line segments, connected by two line segment sides.
- A polygonal prism is a 3-dimensional prism made from two translated polygons connected by rectangles. A regular polygon {p} can construct a uniform n-gonal prism represented by the product {p}×{ }. If p = 4, with square sides symmetry it becomes a cube: {4}×{ } = {4,3}.
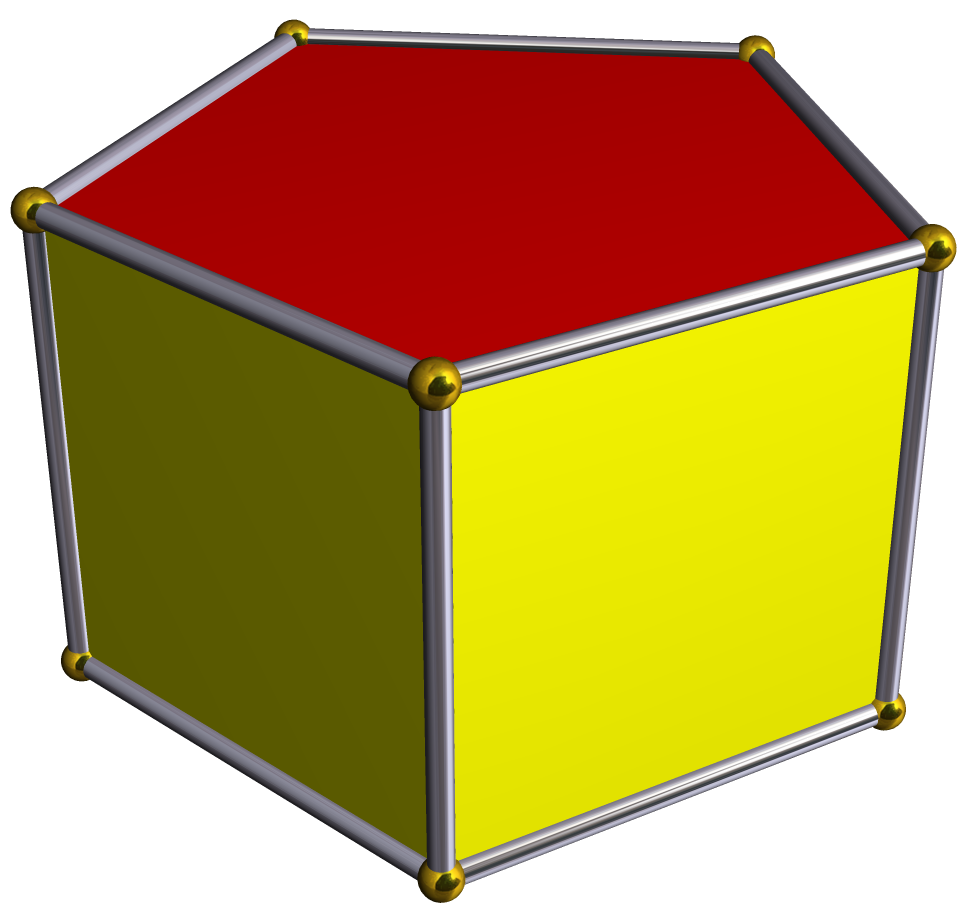
  Example: , Pentagonal prism, {5}×{ }, two parallel pentagons connected by 5 rectangular sides.
- A polyhedral prism is a 4-dimensional prism made from two translated polyhedra connected by 3-dimensional prism cells. A regular polyhedron {p,q} can construct the uniform polychoric prism, represented by the product {p,q}×{ }. If the polyhedron and the sides are cubes, it becomes a tesseract: {4,3}×{ } = {4,3,3}.
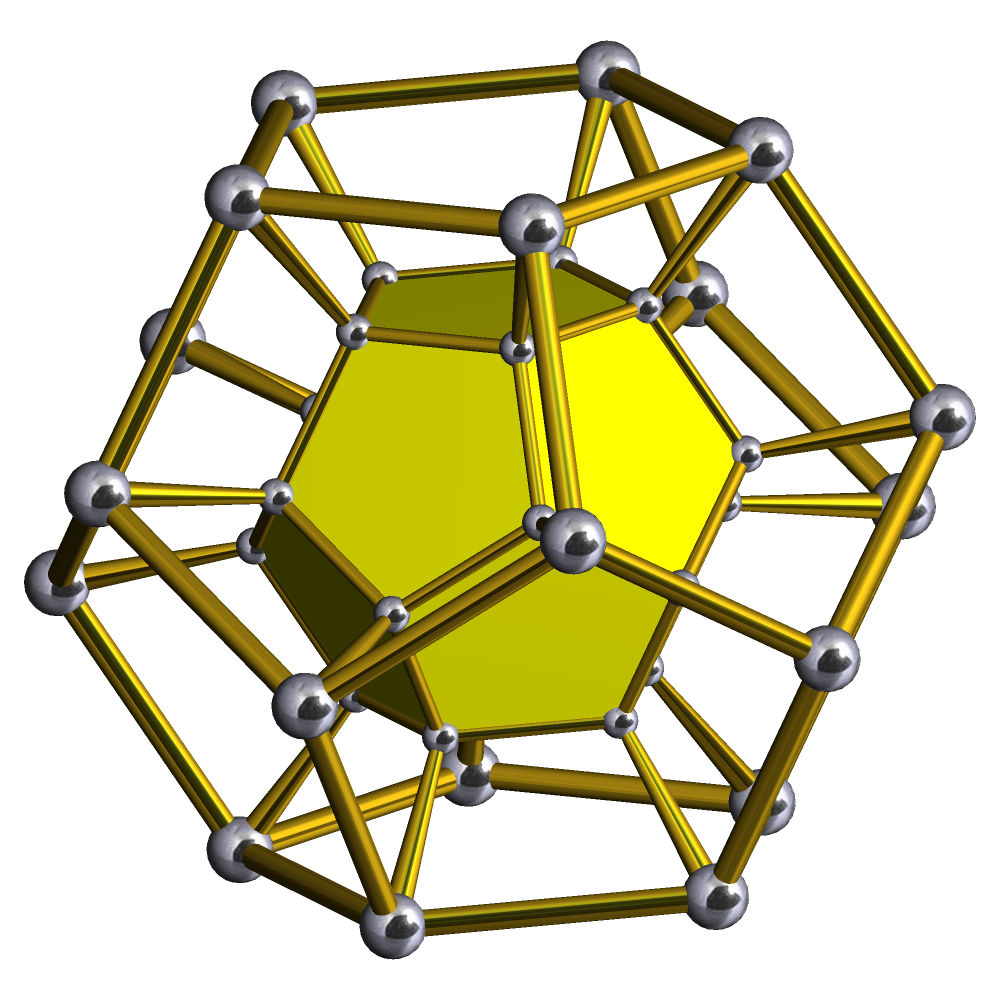
  Example: , Dodecahedral prism, {5,3}×{ }, two parallel dodecahedra connected by 12 pentagonal prism sides.
- ...

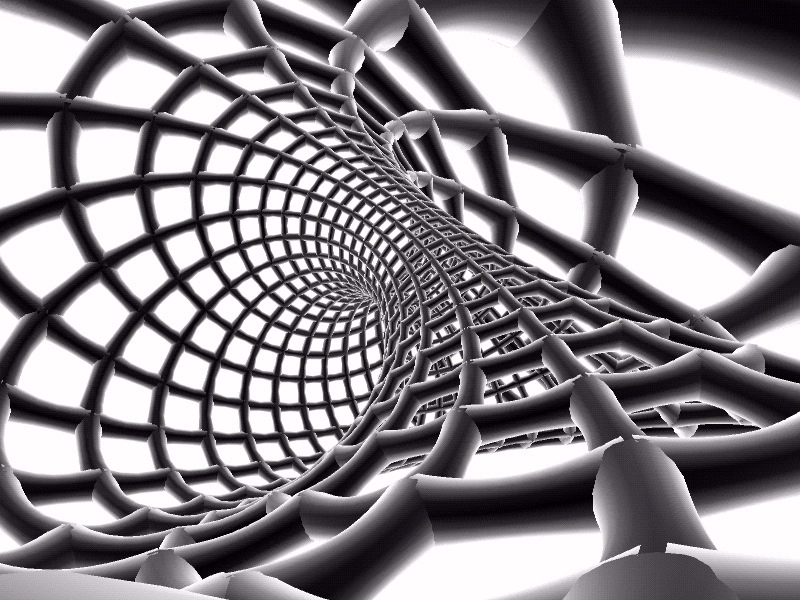
A {23}×{29} duoprism, showing edges in stereographic projection. The squares make a 23×29 grid flat torus.

Higher order prismatic polytopes also exist as cartesian products of any two or more polytopes. The dimension of a product polytope is the sum of the dimensions of its elements. The first examples of these exist in 4-dimensional space; they are called duoprisms as the product of two polygons in 4-dimensions.

Regular duoprisms are represented as {p}×{q}, with pq vertices, 2pq edges, pq square faces, p q-gon faces, q p-gon faces, and bounded by p q-gonal prisms and q p-gonal prisms.

For example, {4}×{4}, a 4-4 duoprism is a lower symmetry form of a tesseract, as is {4,3}×{ }, a cubic prism. {4}×{4}×{ } (4-4 duoprism prism), {4,3}×{4} (cube-4 duoprism) and {4,3,3}×{ } (tesseractic prism) are lower symmetry forms of a 5-cube.

== See also ==
- Apeirogonal prism
- Equiprojective polyhedra
- Rectified prism
- Prismanes
- List of shapes
