= Hexadecagon =

Polygon with 16 edges

Regular hexadecagon
- A regular hexadecagon
- Type: Regular polygon
- Edges and vertices: 16
- Schläfli symbol: {16}, t{8}, tt{4}
- Symmetry group: Dihedral (D_{16}), order 2×16
- Internal angle (degrees): 157.5°
- Properties: Convex, cyclic, equilateral, isogonal, isotoxal
- Dual polygon: Self

In mathematics, a hexadecagon (sometimes called a hexakaidecagon or 16-gon) is a sixteen-sided polygon.

== Regular hexadecagon ==
A regular hexadecagon is a hexadecagon in which all angles are equal and all sides are congruent. Its Schläfli symbol is {16} and can be constructed as a truncated octagon, t{8}, and a twice-truncated square tt{4}. A truncated hexadecagon, t{16}, is a triacontadigon, {32}.

=== Construction ===
As 16 = 2^{4} (a power of two), a regular hexadecagon is constructible using compass and straightedge: this was already known to ancient Greek mathematicians.

Construction of a regular hexadecagon
at a given circumcircle

Construction of a regular hexadecagon
at a given side length, animation. (The construction is very similar to that of octagon at a given side length.)

== Measurements ==
Each angle of a regular hexadecagon is 157.5 degrees, and the total angle measure of any hexadecagon is 2520 degrees.

The area of a regular hexadecagon with edge length t is

$$\begin{align}
A = 4t^2 \cot \frac{\pi}{16} =& 4t^2 \left(1+\sqrt{2}+\sqrt{ 4+2\sqrt{2} }\right)\\
=& 4t^2 (\sqrt{2}+1)(\sqrt{4-2\sqrt{2}}+1)
.\end{align}$$

Because the hexadecagon has a number of sides that is a power of two, its area can be computed in terms of the circumradius R by truncating Viète's formula:

$$A=R^2\cdot\frac{2}{1}\cdot\frac{2}{\sqrt{2}}\cdot\frac{2}{\sqrt{2+\sqrt{2}}}=4R^2\sqrt{2-\sqrt{2}}.$$

Since the area of the circumcircle is $\pi R^2,$ the regular hexadecagon fills approximately 97.45% of its circumcircle.

== Symmetry ==
Symmetry
The 14 symmetries of a regular hexadecagon. Lines of reflections are blue through vertices, purple through edges, and gyration orders are given in the center. Vertices are colored by their symmetry position.

The regular hexadecagon has Dih_{16} symmetry, order 32. There are 4 dihedral subgroups: Dih_{8}, Dih_{4}, Dih_{2}, and Dih_{1}, and 5 cyclic subgroups: Z_{16}, Z_{8}, Z_{4}, Z_{2}, and Z_{1}, the last implying no symmetry.

On the regular hexadecagon, there are 14 distinct symmetries. John Conway labels full symmetry as r32 and no symmetry is labeled a1. The dihedral symmetries are divided depending on whether they pass through vertices (d for diagonal) or edges (p for perpendiculars) Cyclic symmetries in the middle column are labeled as g for their central gyration orders.

The most common high symmetry hexadecagons are d16, an isogonal hexadecagon constructed by eight mirrors can alternate long and short edges, and p16, an isotoxal hexadecagon constructed with equal edge lengths, but vertices alternating two different internal angles. These two forms are duals of each other and have half the symmetry order of the regular hexadecagon.

Each subgroup symmetry allows one or more degrees of freedom for irregular forms. Only the g16 subgroup has no degrees of freedom but can be seen as directed edges.

== Dissection ==
16-cube projection	112 rhomb dissection	
	Regular	Isotoxal

Coxeter states that every zonogon (a 2m-gon whose opposite sides are parallel and of equal length) can be dissected into m(m − 1)/2 parallelograms. In particular this is true for regular polygons with evenly many sides, in which case the parallelograms are all rhombi. For the regular hexadecagon, m = 8, and it can be divided into 28: 4 squares and 3 sets of 8 rhombs. This decomposition is based on a Petrie polygon projection of an 8-cube, with 28 of 1792 faces. The list OEIS: A006245 enumerates the number of solutions as 1232944, including up to 16-fold rotations and chiral forms in reflection.

Dissection into 28 rhombs
8-cube

== Skew hexadecagon ==
3 regular skew zig-zag hexadecagon
{8}#{ }	{8/3}#{ }	{8/5}#{ }
A regular skew hexadecagon is seen as zig-zagging edges of an octagonal antiprism, an octagrammic antiprism, and an octagrammic crossed-antiprism.

A skew hexadecagon is a skew polygon with 24 vertices and edges but not existing on the same plane. The interior of such a hexadecagon is not generally defined. A skew zig-zag hexadecagon has vertices alternating between two parallel planes.

A regular skew hexadecagon is vertex-transitive with equal edge lengths. In 3-dimensions it will be a zig-zag skew hexadecagon and can be seen in the vertices and side edges of an octagonal antiprism with the same D_{8d}, [2^{+},16] symmetry, order 32. The octagrammic antiprism, s{2,16/3} and octagrammic crossed-antiprism, s{2,16/5} also have regular skew octagons.

=== Petrie polygons ===
The regular hexadecagon is the Petrie polygon for many higher-dimensional polytopes, shown in these skew orthogonal projections, including:

A_{15}	B_{8}		D_{9}		2B_{2} (4D)	
15-simplex	8-orthoplex	8-cube	6_{11}	1_{61}	8-8 duopyramid	8-8 duoprism

== Related figures ==
A hexadecagram is a 16-sided star polygon, represented by symbol {16/n}. There are three regular star polygons, {16/3}, {16/5}, {16/7}, using the same vertices, but connecting every third, fifth or seventh points. There are also three compounds: {16/2} is reduced to 2{8} as two octagons, {16/4} is reduced to 4{4} as four squares and {16/6} reduces to 2{8/3} as two octagrams, and finally {16/8} is reduced to 8{2} as eight digons.

Compound and star hexadecagons
Form	Convex polygon	Compound	Star polygon	Compound
Image	{16/1} or {16}	{16/2} or 2{8}	{16/3}	{16/4} or 4{4}
Interior angle	157.5°	135°	112.5°	90°
Form	Star polygon	Compound	Star polygon	Compound
Image	{16/5}	{16/6} or 2{8/3}	{16/7}	{16/8} or 8{2}
Interior angle	67.5°	45°	22.5°	0°

Deeper truncations of the regular octagon and octagram can produce isogonal (vertex-transitive) intermediate hexadecagram forms with equally spaced vertices and two edge lengths.

A truncated octagon is a hexadecagon, t{8} = {16}. A quasitruncated octagon, inverted as {8/7}, is a hexadecagram: t{8/7} = {16/7}. A truncated octagram {8/3} is a hexadecagram: t{8/3} = {16/3} and a quasitruncated octagram, inverted as {8/5}, is a hexadecagram: t{8/5} = {16/5}.

Isogonal truncations of octagon and octagram
Quasiregular	Isogonal	Quasiregular
t{8}={16}		t{8/7}={16/7}
t{8/3}={16/3}		t{8/5}={16/5}

== In art ==
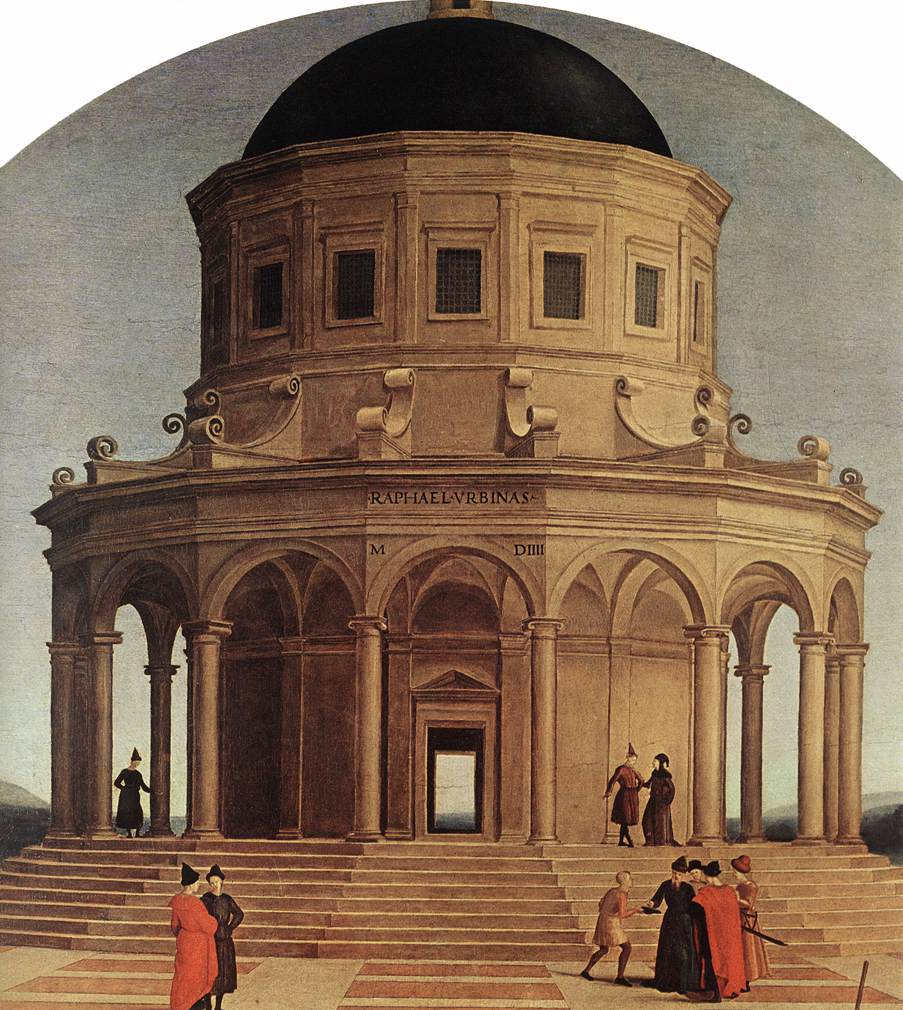
The hexadecagonal tower from Raphael's The Marriage of the Virgin

In the early 16th century, Raphael was the first to construct a perspective image of a regular hexadecagon: the tower in his painting The Marriage of the Virgin has 16 sides, elaborating on an eight-sided tower in a previous painting by Pietro Perugino.

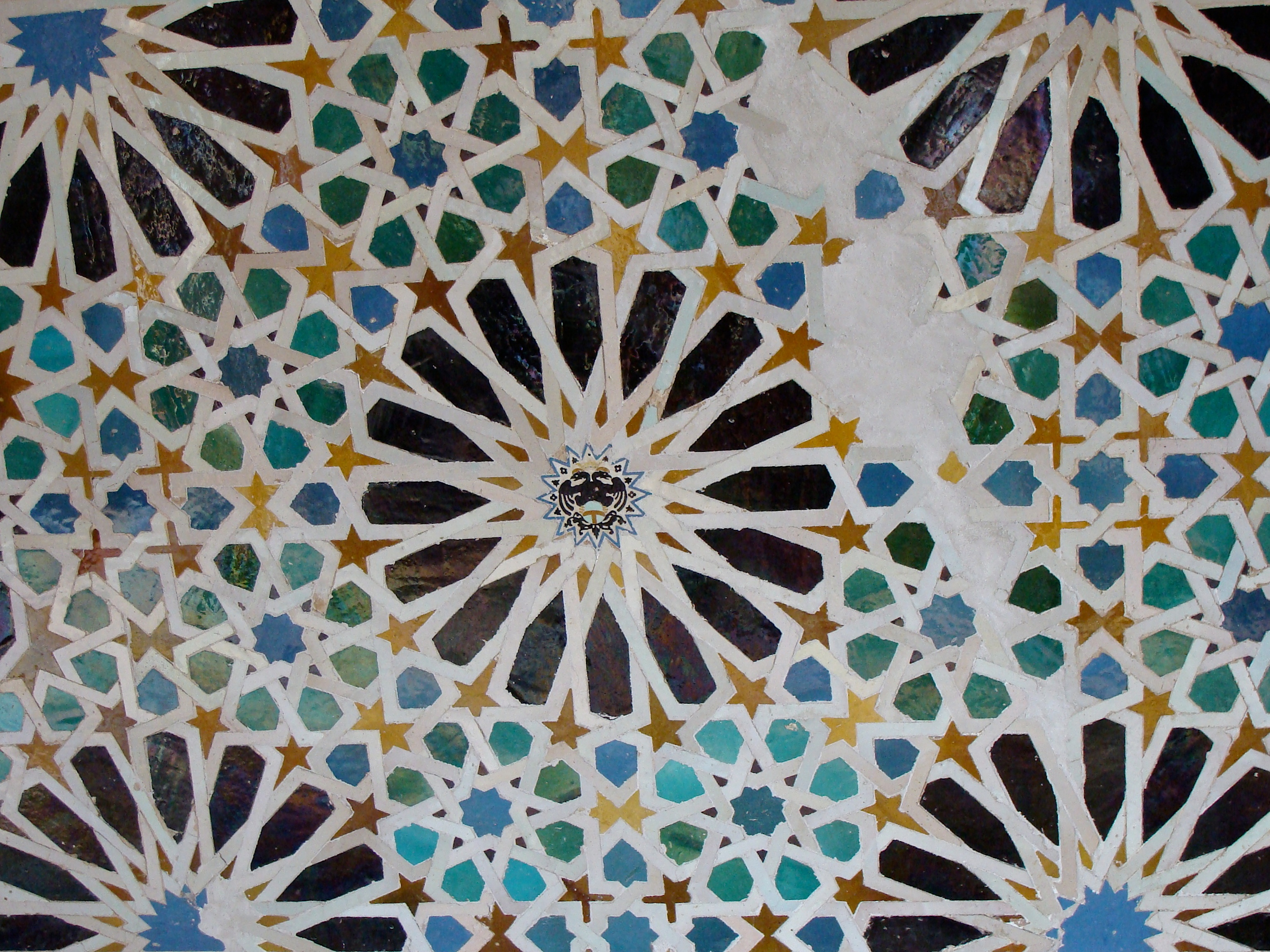
A hexadecagrammic pattern from the Alhambra

Hexadecagrams (16-sided star polygons) are included in the Girih patterns in the Alhambra.

== Irregular hexadecagons ==
An octagonal star can be seen as a concave hexadecagon:

The latter one is seen in many architectures from Christian to Islamic, and also in the logo of IRIB TV4.

== See also ==
- Octagram
- Rhumbline network
