= J39 =

J39 may refer to:

- Elongated pentagonal gyrobicupola, a Johnson solid (J_{39})
- General Electric J39, a proposed jet engine
- HMS Elgin (J39), a Hunt-class minesweeper of the Royal Navy
- LNER Class J39, a British steam locomotive class
