= Decagrammic antiprism =

Polyhedron with 22 faces

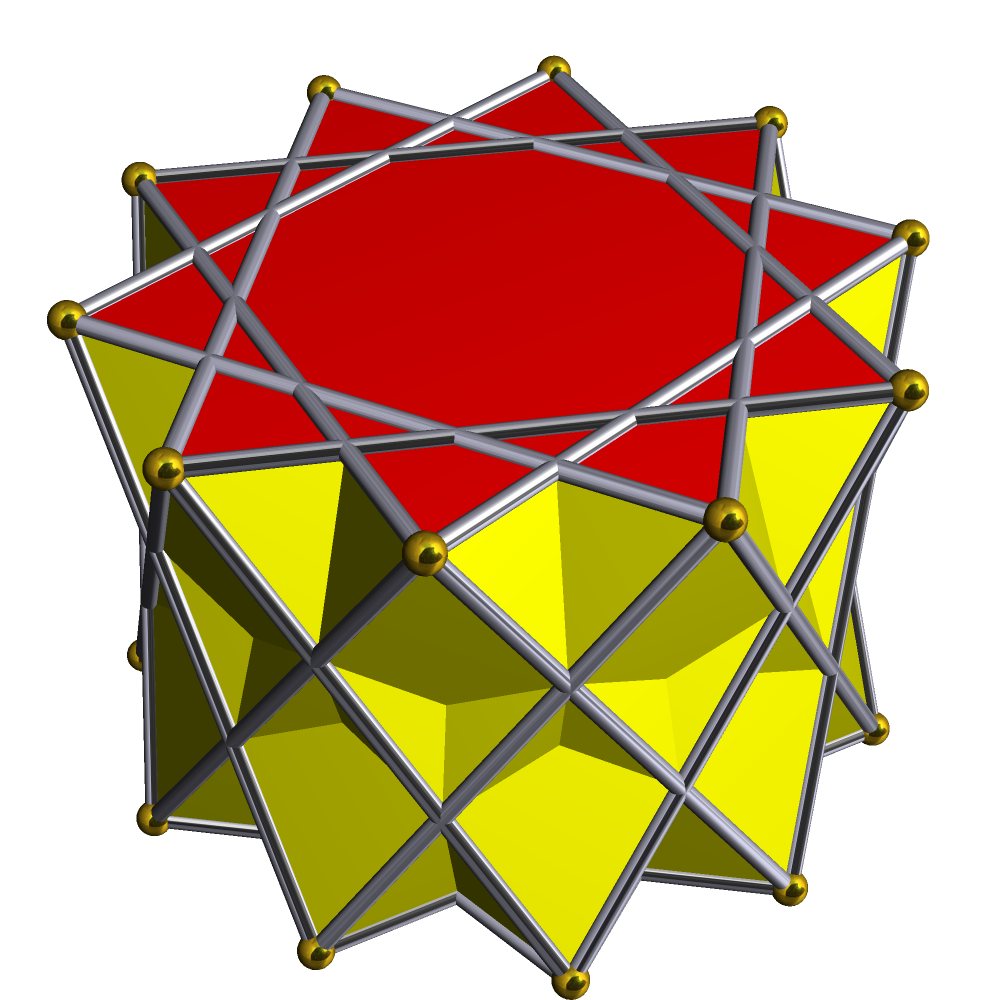
- Type: Uniform polyhedron
- Faces: 2 Decagrams; 20 triangles
- Edges: 40
- Vertices: 20
- Vertex configuration: 10/3.3.3.3
- Wythoff symbol: -2 2 10/3
- Symmetry group: D_{10d}, [2^{+},20], (2*10), order 40
- Dual polyhedron: Decagrammic deltohedron
- Properties: nonconvex

Vertex figure
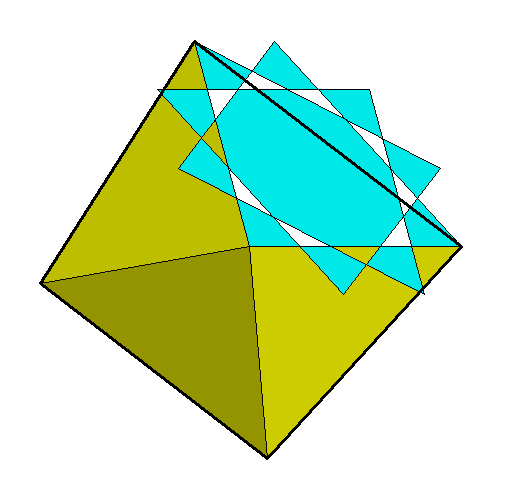

3D model of a (uniform) decagrammic antiprism

In geometry, the decagrammic antiprism is one in an infinite set of nonconvex antiprisms formed by triangle sides and two regular star polygon caps, in this case two decagrams.

== See also ==
- Prismatic uniform polyhedron
