= Elongated pentagonal orthobicupola =

38th Johnson solid (32 faces)

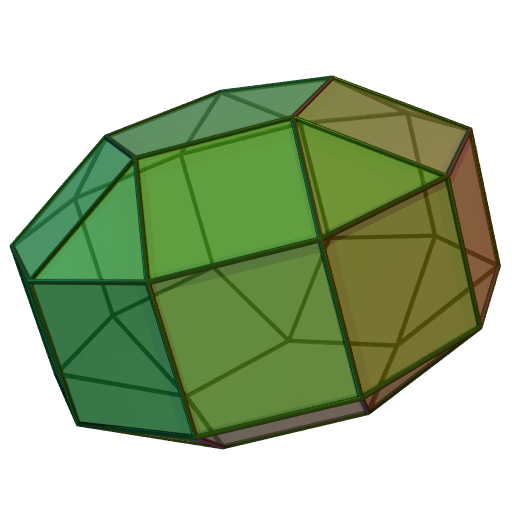
- Type: Johnson; J_{37} – J_{38} – J_{39}
- Faces: 10 triangles 2×5+10 squares 2 pentagons
- Edges: 60
- Vertices: 30
- Vertex configuration: 20(3.4^{3}); 10(3.4.5.4)
- Symmetry group: D_{5h}
- Dual polyhedron: -
- Properties: convex

Net
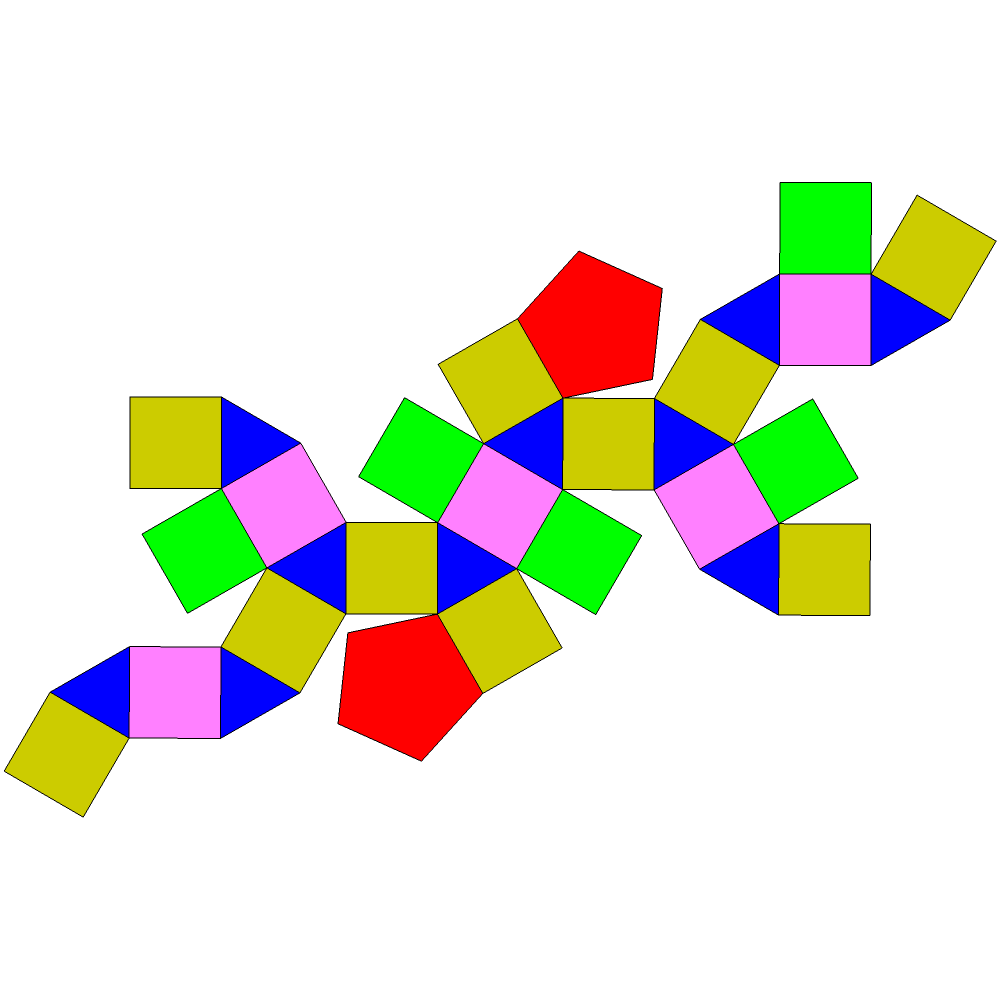

In geometry, the elongated pentagonal orthobicupola or cantellated pentagonal prism is one of the Johnson solids (J_{38}). As the name suggests, it can be constructed by elongating a pentagonal orthobicupola (J_{30}) by inserting a decagonal prism between its two congruent halves. Rotating one of the cupolae through 36 degrees before inserting the prism yields an elongated pentagonal gyrobicupola (J_{39}).

A Johnson solid is one of 92 strictly convex polyhedra that is composed of regular polygon faces but are not uniform polyhedra (that is, they are not Platonic solids, Archimedean solids, prisms, or antiprisms). They were named by Norman Johnson, who first listed these polyhedra in 1966.

3D model of an elongated pentagonal orthobicupola

== Formulae ==
The following formulae for volume and surface area can be used if all faces are regular, with edge length a:

$$V=\frac{1}{6}\left(10+8\sqrt{5}+15\sqrt{5+2\sqrt{5}}\right)a^3\approx12.3423...a^3$$

$$A=\left(20+\sqrt{\frac{5}{2}\left(10+\sqrt{5}+\sqrt{75+30\sqrt{5}}\right)}\right)a^2\approx27.7711...a^2$$
