= Prismatic uniform polyhedron =

Uniform polyhedron with dihedral symmetry

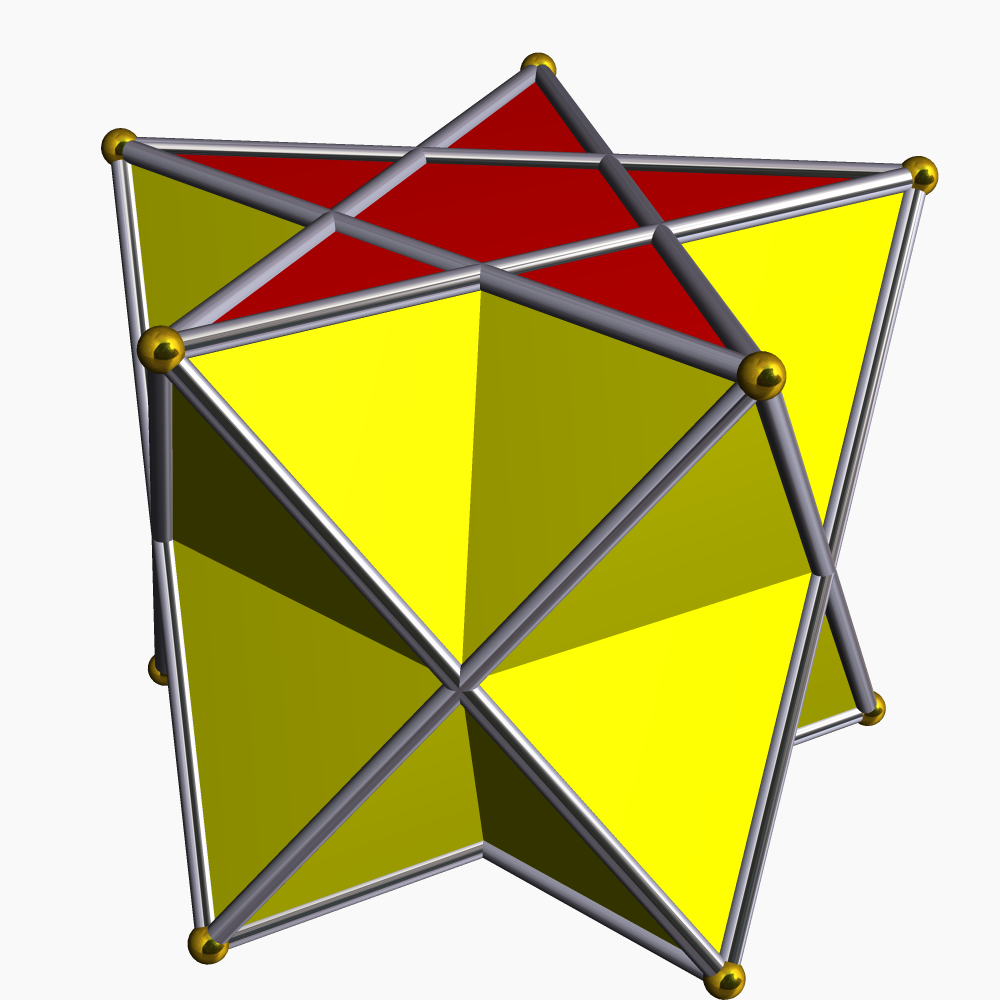
A pentagrammic antiprism is made of two regular pentagrams and 10 equilateral triangles.

In geometry, a prismatic uniform polyhedron is a uniform polyhedron with dihedral symmetry. They exist in two infinite families, the uniform prisms and the uniform antiprisms. All have their vertices in parallel planes and are therefore prismatoids.

== Vertex configuration and symmetry groups ==
Because they are isogonal (vertex-transitive), their vertex arrangement uniquely corresponds to a symmetry group.

The difference between the prismatic and antiprismatic symmetry groups is that D_{ph} has the vertices lined up in both planes, which gives it a reflection plane perpendicular to its p-fold axis (parallel to the {p/q} polygon); while D_{pd} has the vertices twisted relative to the other plane, which gives it a rotatory reflection. Each has p reflection planes which contain the p-fold axis.

The D_{ph} symmetry group contains inversion if and only if p is even, while D_{pd} contains inversion symmetry if and only if p is odd.

== Enumeration ==
There are:

- prisms, for each rational number p/q > 2, with symmetry group D_{ph};
- antiprisms, for each rational number p/q > 3/2, with symmetry group D_{pd} if q is odd, D_{ph} if q is even.

If p/q is an integer, i.e. if q = 1, the prism or antiprism is convex. (The fraction is always assumed to be stated in lowest terms.)

An antiprism with p/q < 2 is crossed or retrograde; its vertex figure resembles a bowtie. If p/q < 3/2 no uniform antiprism can exist, as its vertex figure would have to violate the triangle inequality. If p/q = 3/2 the uniform antiprism is degenerate (has zero height).

== Forms by symmetry ==
Note: The tetrahedron, cube, and octahedron are listed here with dihedral symmetry (as a digonal antiprism, square prism and triangular antiprism respectively), although if uniformly colored, the tetrahedron also has tetrahedral symmetry and the cube and octahedron also have octahedral symmetry.

Symmetry group	Convex	Star forms						
D_{2d} [2^{+},2] (2*2)	3.3.3							
D_{3h} [2,3] (*223)	3.4.4							
D_{3d} [2^{+},3] (2*3)	3.3.3.3							
D_{4h} [2,4] (*224)	4.4.4							
D_{4d} [2^{+},4] (2*4)	3.3.3.4							
D_{5h} [2,5] (*225)	4.4.5	4.4.5/2	3.3.3.5/2					
D_{5d} [2^{+},5] (2*5)	3.3.3.5	3.3.3.5/3						
D_{6h} [2,6] (*226)	4.4.6							
D_{6d} [2^{+},6] (2*6)	3.3.3.6							
D_{7h} [2,7] (*227)	4.4.7	4.4.7/2	4.4.7/3	3.3.3.7/2	3.3.3.7/4			
D_{7d} [2^{+},7] (2*7)	3.3.3.7	3.3.3.7/3						
D_{8h} [2,8] (*228)	4.4.8	4.4.8/3						
D_{8d} [2^{+},8] (2*8)	3.3.3.8	3.3.3.8/3	3.3.3.8/5					
D_{9h} [2,9] (*229)	4.4.9	4.4.9/2	4.4.9/4	3.3.3.9/2	3.3.3.9/4			
D_{9d} [2^{+},9] (2*9)	3.3.3.9	3.3.3.9/5						
D_{10h} [2,10] (*2.2.10)	4.4.10	4.4.10/3						
D_{10d} [2^{+},10] (2*10)	3.3.3.10	3.3.3.10/3						
D_{11h} [2,11] (*2.2.11)	4.4.11	4.4.11/2	4.4.11/3	4.4.11/4	4.4.11/5	3.3.3.11/2	3.3.3.11/4	3.3.3.11/6
D_{11d} [2^{+},11] (2*11)	3.3.3.11	3.3.3.11/3	3.3.3.11/5	3.3.3.11/7				
D_{12h} [2,12] (*2.2.12)	4.4.12	4.4.12/5						
D_{12d} [2^{+},12] (2*12)	3.3.3.12	3.3.3.12/5	3.3.3.12/7					
...

== See also ==
- Uniform polyhedron
- Prism (geometry)
- Antiprism
