= Octagrammic antiprism =

Polyhedron with 18 faces

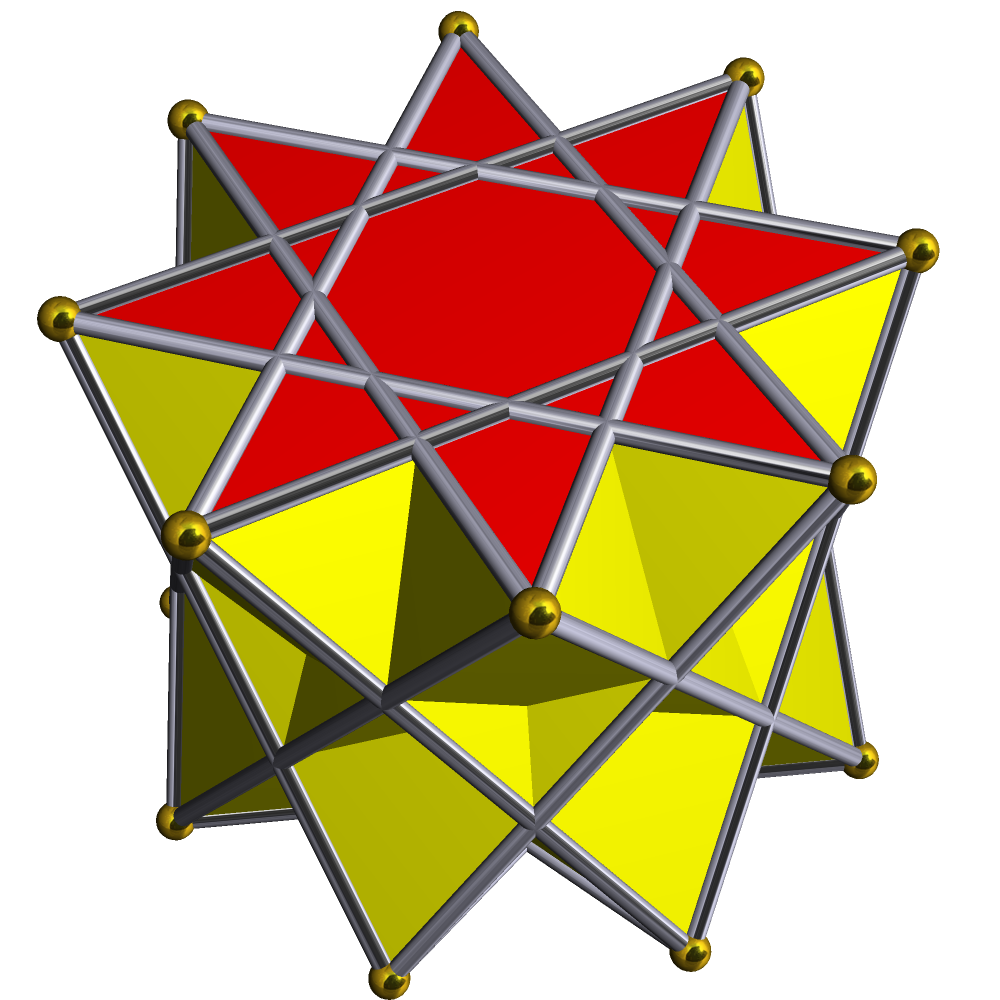
- Type: Uniform polyhedron
- Faces: 2 {8/3} 16 {3}
- Edges: 32
- Vertices: 16
- Vertex configuration: ^{8}/_{3}.3.3.3
- Wythoff symbol: |2 2 8/3
- Schläfli symbol: s{2,16/3}
- Symmetry group: D_{8d}, [2^{+},16], (2*8), order 32
- Dual polyhedron: Octagrammic deltohedron
- Properties: nonconvex

Vertex figure
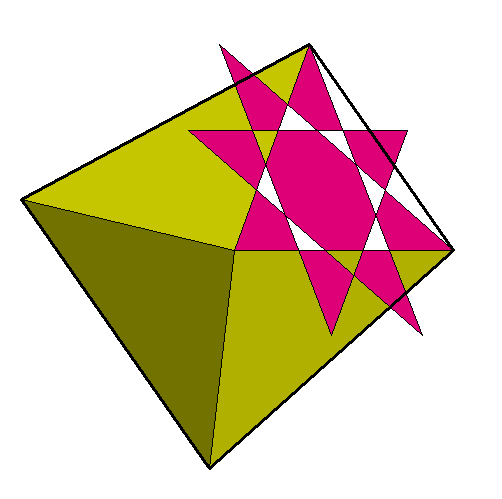

In geometry, the octagrammic antiprism is one in an infinite set of nonconvex antiprisms formed by triangle sides and two regular star polygon caps, in this case two octagrams.

== See also ==
- Prismatic uniform polyhedron
- Octagrammic crossed-antiprism
