= Octagrammic prism =

Polyhedron with 10 faces

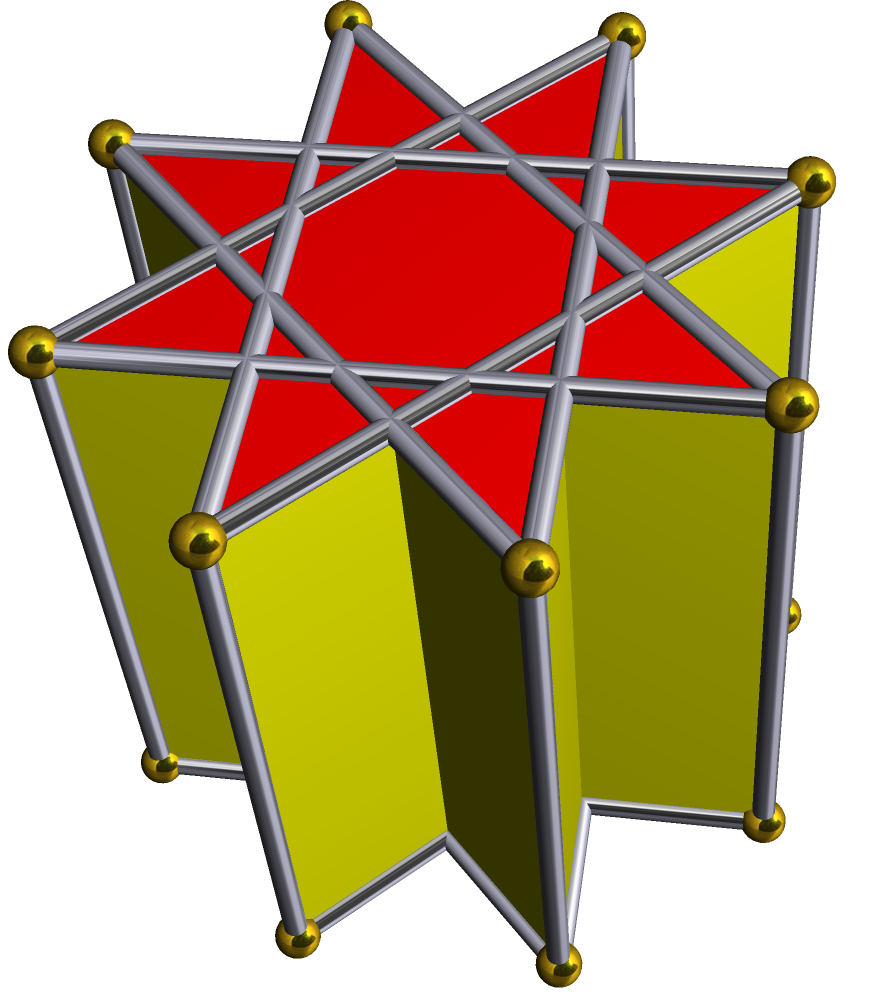
- Type: Uniform polyhedron
- Faces: 2 octagrams 8 squares
- Edges: 24
- Vertices: 16
- Vertex configuration: ^{8}/_{3}.4.4
- Wythoff symbol: 2 8/3 | 2
- Schläfli symbol: s{2,16/3} sr{2,8/3}
- Symmetry group: D_{8h}
- Dual polyhedron: octagrammic bipyramid
- Properties: nonconvex

Vertex figure
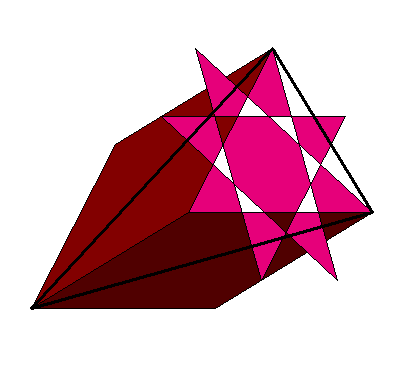

In geometry, the octagrammic prism is one of an infinite set of nonconvex prisms formed by square sides and two regular star polygon caps, in this case two octagrams. An octagrammic prism has 16 vertices, 2 octagrammic stars, 8 square faces, and 24 edges.
