= Pentagrammic crossed-antiprism =

Uniform pentagrammic crossed-antiprism
Type	Prismatic uniform polyhedron
Elements	F = 12, E = 20; V = 10 (χ = 2)
Faces by sides	10{3}+2{^{5}/_{2}}
Schläfli symbol	s{2,^{10}/_{3}} sr{2,^{5}/_{3}}
Wythoff symbol	| 2 2 ^{5}/_{3}
Coxeter diagram	=
Symmetry	D_{5d}, [5,2], (*522), order 20
Rotation group	D_{5}, [5,2]^{+}, (552), order 10
Index references	U_{80(a)}
Dual	Pentagrammic concave trapezohedron
Properties	nonconvex
Vertex figure 3.3.3.^{5}/_{3} or 3.3.3.-^{5}/_{2}

3D model of a (uniform) pentagrammic crossed-antiprism

In geometry, the pentagrammic crossed-antiprism is one in an infinite set of nonconvex antiprisms formed by triangle sides and two regular star polygon caps, in this case two pentagrams.

It differs from the pentagrammic antiprism by having triangular lateral faces which intersect (or "cross") the antiprism's axis of symmetry; in other words, for each lateral face, one of the triangle's vertices is on the opposite side of the axis of symmetry from the other two.

This polyhedron is identified with the indexed name U_{80} as a uniform polyhedron.

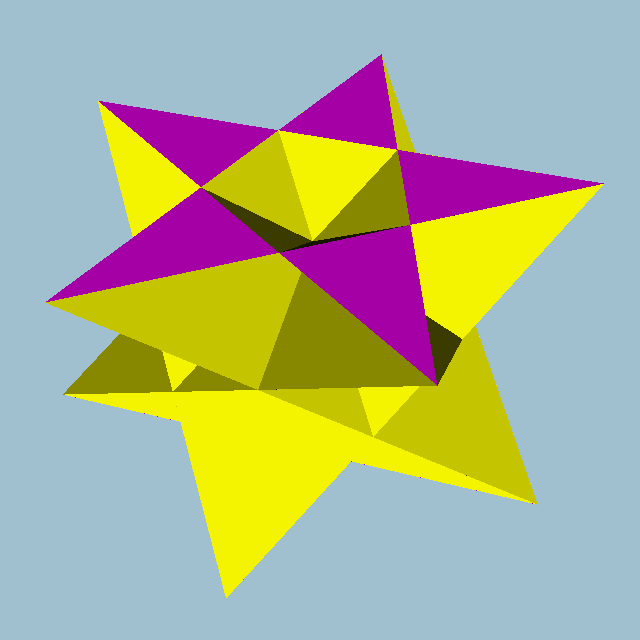
An alternative representation with hollow pentagrams.

The pentagrammic crossed-antiprism may be inscribed within an icosahedron, and has ten triangular faces in common with the great icosahedron. It has the same vertex arrangement as the pentagonal antiprism. In fact, it may be considered as a parabidiminished great icosahedron.

Pentagrammic crossed-antiprism	Great icosahedron coloured with D_{5d} symmetry

== See also ==
- Prismatic uniform polyhedron
