= Pentagram =

Five-pointed star polygon

Pentagram

A pentagram (sometimes known as a pentalpha, pentangle, or star pentagon) is a regular five-pointed star polygon, formed from the diagonal line segments of a convex (or simple, or non-self-intersecting) regular pentagon. Drawing a circle around the five points creates a similar symbol referred to as the pentacle, which is used widely by Wiccans and in paganism, or as a sign of life and connections, but there is also an inverted version.

The word pentagram comes from the Greek word πεντάγραμμον (pentagrammon), from πέντε (pente), "five" + γραμμή (grammē), "line". The word pentagram refers to just the star and the word pentacle refers to the star within a circle, although there is some overlap in usage. The word pentalpha is a 17th-century revival of a post-classical Greek name of the shape.

== History ==
=== Early history ===
Early pentagrams have been found on Sumerian pottery from Ur c. 3500 BCE, and the five-pointed star was at various times the symbol of Ishtar or Marduk.

A Pythagorean "Hugieia Pentagram"

A right-handed interlaced pentagram, popular with Wiccans and some other neo-pagans. The Flag of Morocco often bears the left-handed version.

Flinders Petrie mentioned that the pentagram started to appear as a decoration on Predynastic Egyptian pottery at around "Sequence Date" 64 in his system, corresponding to the early Naqada III era.

Abe no Seimei's pentagram mon represents the Wu Xing.

Pentagram symbols from about 5,000 years ago were found in the Liangzhu culture of China. A pentagram appeared in a Chinese text on music theory from the Warring States period (c. 475 – 221 BCE) as a diagram of the mathematical relations between the five notes in a particular Chinese musical scale.

The pentagram was known to the ancient Greeks, with a depiction on a vase possibly dating back to the 7th century BCE. Pythagoreanism originated in the 6th century BCE and used the pentagram as a symbol of mutual recognition, well-being, and good deeds and charity.

During 300–150 BCE, preceding the Hasmonean period, the pentagram was the symbol of the Judahite administration of Jerusalem, the seal of which was denoted with the Hebrew letters ירשלם (YRŠLM). In Modern Hebrew, Jerusalem is spelled יְרוּשָׁלַיִם (Yĕrûšālayim).

In the Serer religion and the Serer creation myth, the pentagram, called Yooniir (also spelled Yoonir) in the Serer language, is the symbol of the Universe. The Serer religion posits that the peak of the five-pointed star represents the Serer creator deity, Roog. The other four points represent the cardinal points of the Universe. The crossing of the lines ("bottom left" and "top right" and "top left and bottom right") pinpoints the axis of the Universe, through which all energies pass. The top point is "the point of departure and conclusion, the origin and the end". Yoonir also represents "good fortune and destiny"—in a Serer religious sense, and in an ethno-nationalistic sense—following centuries of religious and ethnic persecution, it also represents the Serer people, an ethnoreligious group with members in Senegal, Gambia, and Mauritania. The Serer have a detailed pictorial representation of the Universe, representing the three worlds in Serer primordial time: the invisible world, the terrestrial world, and the nocturnal world.

=== Western symbolism ===
==== Middle Ages ====
The pentagram was used in Christendom during the Middle Ages as a symbol for the five senses and of the Five Holy Wounds of Jesus Christ. The pentagram is featured with a symbolic role in the 14th-century English poem Sir Gawain and the Green Knight, in which the symbol decorates the shield of the hero, Gawain. The unnamed Gawain Poet credits the symbol's origin to King Solomon, explaining that each of the five interconnected points represents a virtue tied to a group of five: Gawain is perfect in his five senses and five fingers; faithful to the Five Holy Wounds; takes courage from the five joys of Mary, mother of Jesus; and exemplifies the five virtues of knighthood, which are generosity, friendship, chastity, chivalry, and piety.

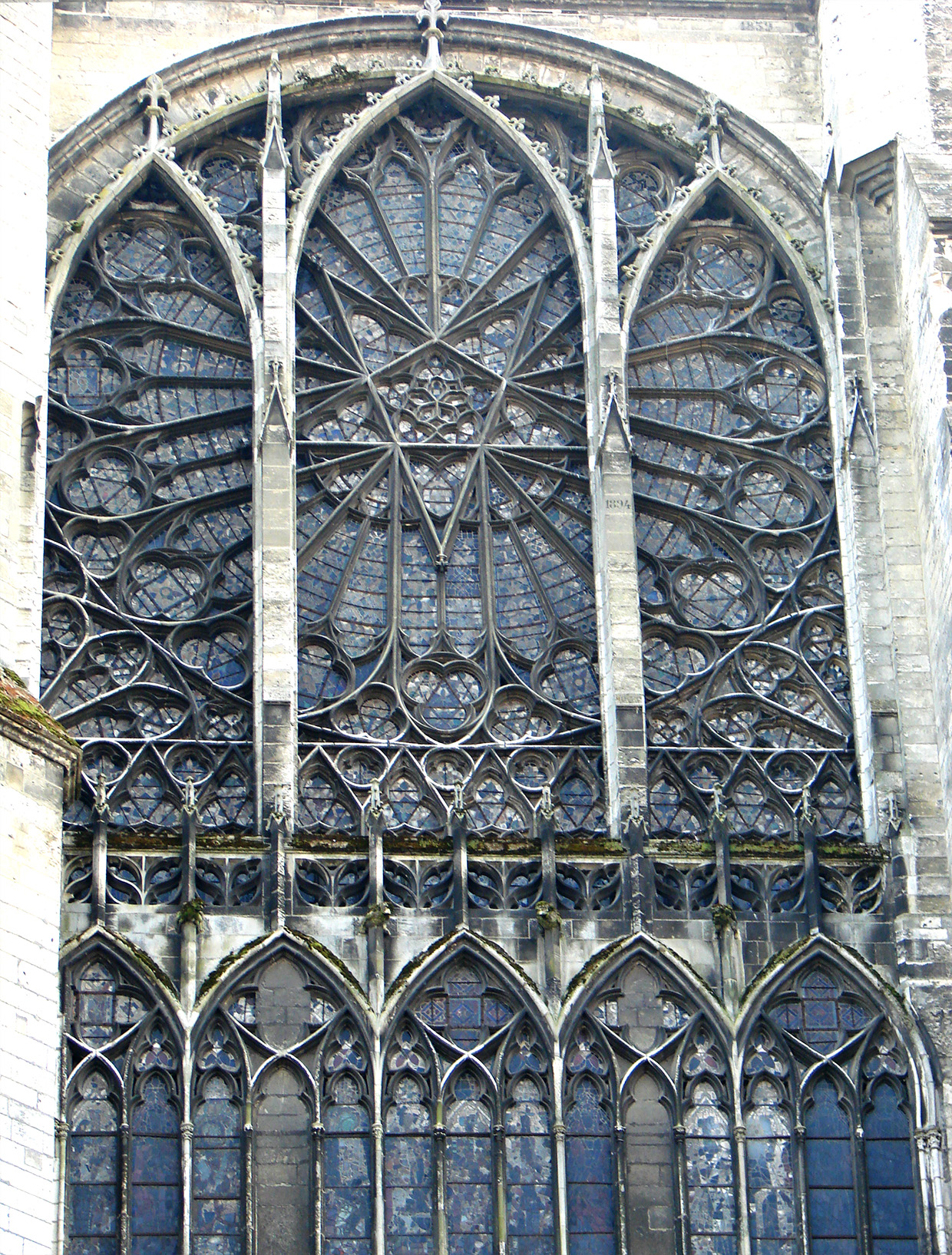
The North rose of Amiens Cathedral

The north-facing rose of Amiens Cathedral—built in the 13th century—exhibits a pentagram-based motif. Some sources interpret the unusual downward-pointing star as symbolizing the Holy Spirit descending on celebrants.

==== Renaissance ====
Heinrich Cornelius Agrippa and others perpetuated the pentagram's popularity as a magic symbol, attributing the five neoplatonic elements to its five points, in typical Renaissance fashion. Agrippa depicts the human body inscribed in an 'upright' (point-up) pentagram and another with its hands in rotated pentagrams, among numerous other geometrical figures, in the section on 'the proportions and harmonious measures of the human body', and an 'inverted' (point-down) version of the Pythagorean 'hygeia' pentagram in the section on 'characters, received only by revelation, which no other kind of reasoning can discover', alongside variations of the Chi-Rho and the Hebrew word Makabi.

'Of this type are the signet shown to Constantine, which most people called a cross, inscribed in Latin letters, 'in this conquer', and another revealed to Antiochus who was surnamed Soteris, in the shape of a pentagon, which issued health, for resolved into letters, it issued the word ὑγίεα, that is, 'health', in the confidence and virtue of which signs, each of the kings won a notable victory against their enemies. Thus Judas, who for this reason was afterwards known as Maccabeus, was about to fight with the Jews against Antiochus Eupatorus, and received that noble seal מׄכׄבׄיׄ from the angel'.

==== Romanticism ====
By the mid-19th century, a further distinction had developed amongst occultists regarding the pentagram's orientation. With a single point upward, it depicted the spirit presiding over the four elements of matter and was essentially "good". However, the influential but controversial writer Éliphas Lévi, known for believing that magic was a real science, had called it evil whenever the symbol appeared the other way up:

- "A reversed pentagram, with two points projecting upwards, is a symbol of evil and attracts sinister forces because it overturns the proper order of things and demonstrates the triumph of matter over spirit. It is the goat of lust attacking the heavens with its horns, a sign execrated by initiates."
- "The flaming star, which, when turned upside down, is the heirolgyphic [sic] sign of the goat of black magic, whose head may be drawn in the star, the two horns at the top, the ears to the right and left, the beard at the bottom. It is a sign of antagonism and fatality. It is the goat of lust attacking the heavens with its horns."
- "Let us keep the figure of the Five-pointed Star always upright, with the topmost triangle pointing to heaven, for it is the seat of wisdom, and if the figure is reversed, perversion and evil will be the result."
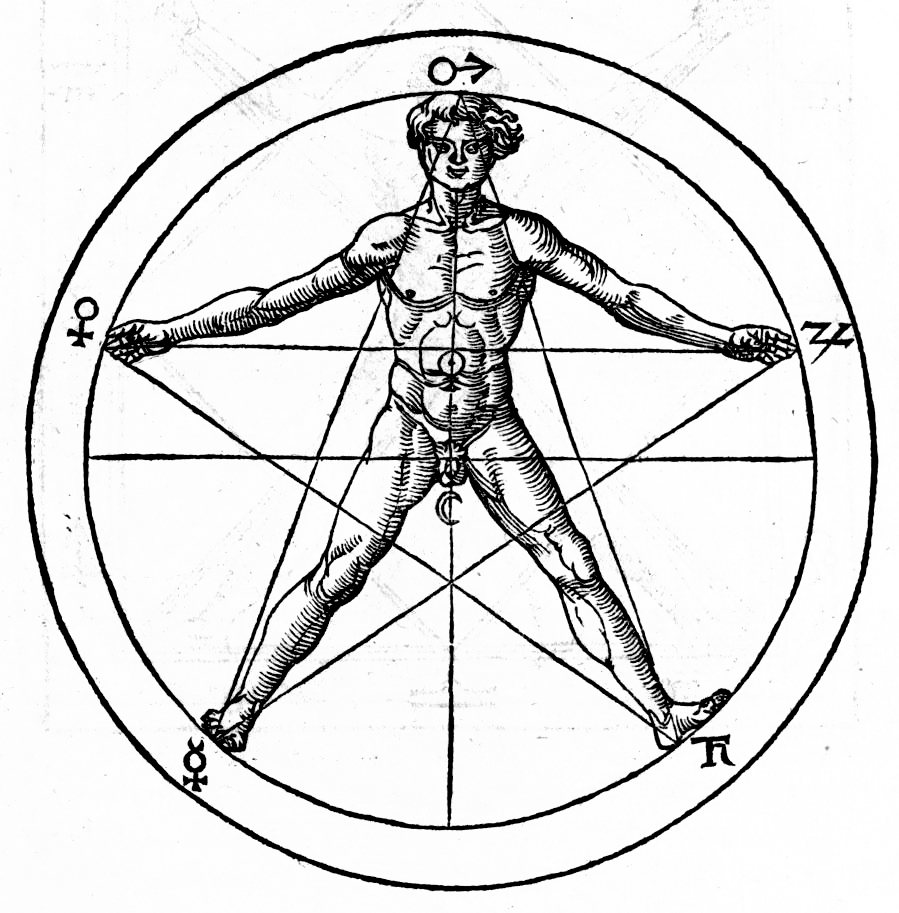
Man inscribed in a pentagram, from Heinrich Cornelius Agrippa's De occulta philosophia libri tres. The five signs at the pentagram's vertices are astrological.

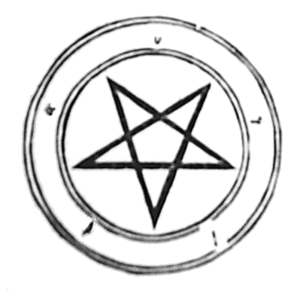
Another pentagram from Agrippa's book. This one has the Pythagorean letters inscribed around the circle.

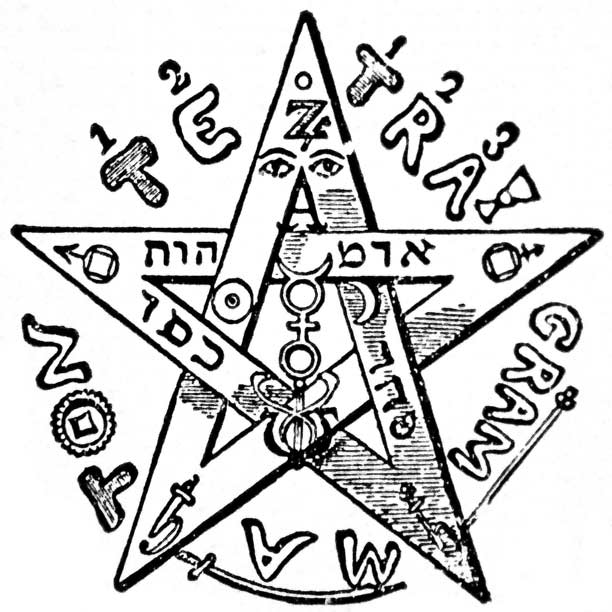
The occultist and magician Éliphas Lévi's pentagram, which he considered to be a symbol of the microcosm, or human

The apotropaic (protective) use in German folklore of the pentagram symbol (called Drudenfuss in German) is referred to by Goethe in Faust (1808), where a pentagram prevents Mephistopheles from leaving a room (but did not prevent him from entering by the same way, as the outward pointing corner of the diagram happened to be imperfectly drawn):

Mephistopheles:

I must confess, I'm prevented though
By a little thing that hinders me,
The Druid's-foot on your doorsill–

Faust:

The Pentagram gives you pain?
Then tell me, you Son of Hell,
If that's the case, how did you gain
Entry? Are spirits like you cheated?

Mephistopheles:

Look carefully! It's not completed:
One angle, if you inspect it closely
Has, as you see, been left a little open.

Also protective is the use in Icelandic folklore of a gestured or carved rather than painted pentagram (called smèrhnút in Icelandic), according to 19th century folklorist Jón Árnason:

A butter that comes from the fake vomit is called a fake butter; it looks like any other butter; but if one makes a sign of a cross over it, or carves a cross on it, or a figure called a buttermilk-knot,^{*} it all explodes into small pieces and becomes like a grain of dross, so that nothing remains of it, except only particles, or it subsides like foam. Therefore it seems more prudent, if a person is offered a horrible butter to eat, or as a fee, to make either mark on it, because a fake butter cannot withstand either a cross mark or a butter-knot.
* The butter-knot is shaped like this:

=== Uses in modern occultism ===
Based on Renaissance-era occultism, the pentagram entered the symbolism of modern occultists. Its primary use is a continuation of the ancient Babylonian use of the pentagram as an apotropaic charm to protect against evil forces. Éliphas Lévi claimed that "The Pentagram expresses the mind's domination over the elements and it is by this sign that we bind the demons of the air, the spirits of fire, the spectres of water, and the ghosts of earth." In this spirit, the Hermetic Order of the Golden Dawn developed the use of the pentagram in the lesser banishing ritual of the pentagram, which is still used to this day by those who practice Golden Dawn-type magic.

Aleister Crowley made use of the pentagram in the system of magick used in Thelema: an adverse or inverted pentagram represents the descent of spirit into matter, according to the interpretation of Lon Milo DuQuette. Crowley contradicted his old comrades in the Hermetic Order of the Golden Dawn, who, following Levi, considered this orientation of the symbol evil and associated it with the triumph of matter over spirit.

=== Use in new religious movements ===
==== Baháʼí Faith ====
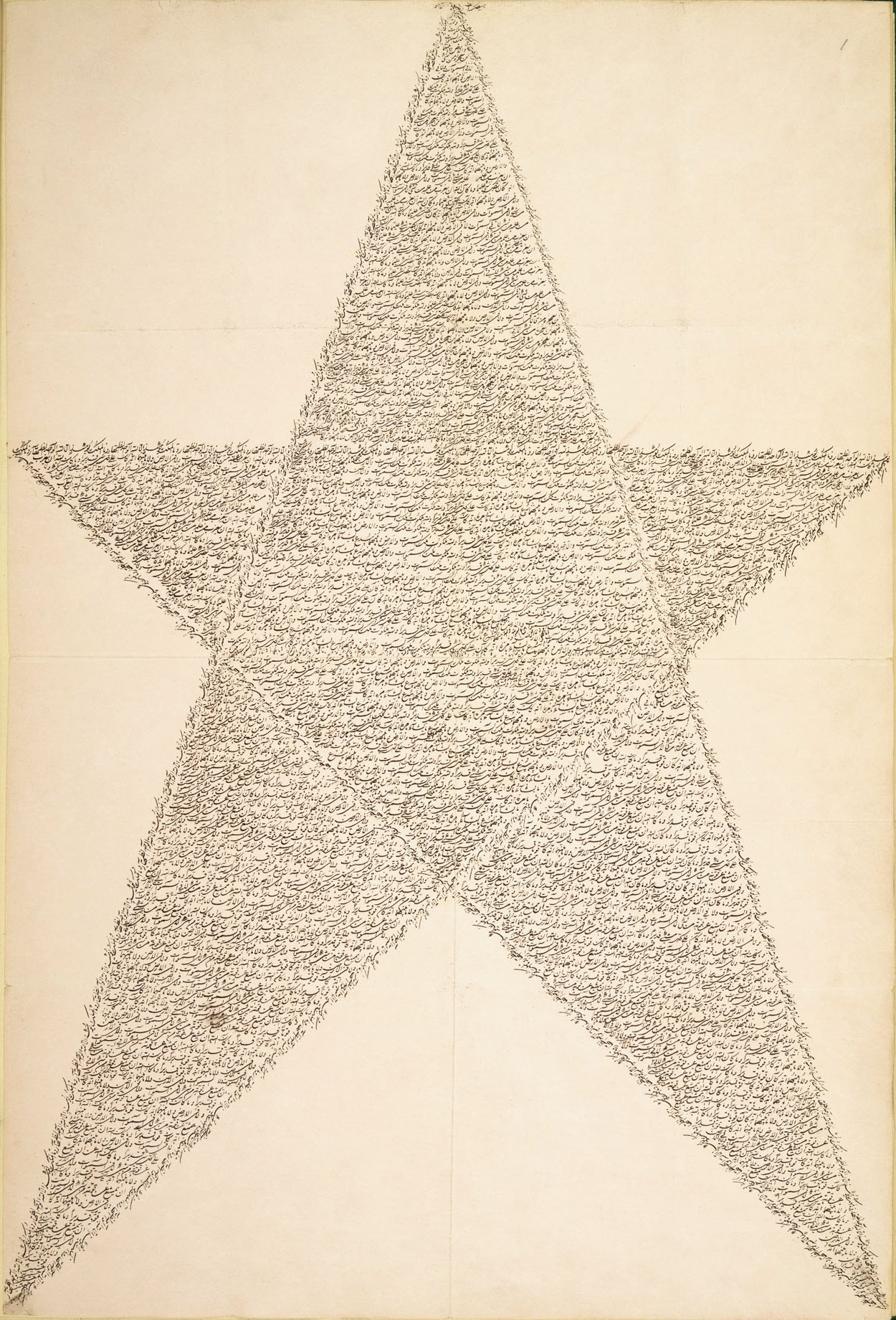
Haykal by the Báb written in his own hand

The five-pointed star is a symbol of the Baháʼí Faith. In the Baháʼí Faith, the star is known as the Haykal (Arabic: "temple"), and it was initiated and established by the Báb. The Báb and Bahá'u'lláh wrote various works in the form of a pentagram.

==== The Church of Jesus Christ of Latter-day Saints ====
The Church of Jesus Christ of Latter-day Saints is theorized to have begun using both upright and inverted five-pointed stars in Temple architecture, dating from the Nauvoo Illinois Temple dedicated on 30 April 1846. Other temples decorated with five-pointed stars in both orientations include the Salt Lake Temple and the Logan Utah Temple. These usages come from the symbolism found in Revelation chapter 12: "And there appeared a great wonder in heaven; a woman clothed with the sun, and the moon under her feet, and upon her head a crown of twelve stars."

==== Wicca ====
Typical Neopagan pentagram (circumscribed)

USVA headstone emblem 37

Because of a perceived association with Satanism and occultism, many United States schools in the late 1990s sought to prevent students from displaying the pentagram on clothing or jewelry. In public schools, such actions by administrators were determined in 2000 to be in violation of students' First Amendment right to free exercise of religion.

The encircled pentagram (referred to as a pentacle by the plaintiffs) was added to the list of 38 approved religious symbols to be placed on the tombstones of fallen service members at Arlington National Cemetery on 24 April 2007. The decision was made following ten applications from families of fallen soldiers who practiced Wicca. The government paid the families US$225,000 to settle their pending lawsuits.

=== Other religious use ===
==== Satanism ====
The inverted pentagram is the most notable and widespread symbol of Satanism.

The goat head of Baphomet forms an inverted pentagram, as depicted in the Sigil of Baphomet

The inverted pentagram is broadly used in Satanism, sometimes depicted with the goat's head of Baphomet, as popularized by the Church of Satan since 1968. LaVeyan Satanists pair the goat head with Hebrew letters at the five points of the pentagram to form the Sigil of Baphomet. The Baphomet sigil was adapted for the Joy of Satan Ministries logo, using cuneiform characters at the five points of the pentagram, reflecting the shape's earliest use in Sumeria. The inverted pentagram also appears in The Satanic Temple logo, with an alternative depiction of Baphomet's head. Other depictions of the Satanic goat's head resemble the inverted pentagram without its explicit outline.

==== Serer religion ====
The five-pointed star is a symbol of the Serer religion and the Serer people of West Africa. Called Yoonir in their language, it symbolizes the universe in the Serer creation myth, and also represents the star Sirius.

=== Other modern use ===
- The pentagram is featured on the national flags of Morocco (adopted 1915) and Ethiopia (adopted 1996 and readopted 2009)
Morocco's flag

Ethiopia's flag
- The Order of the Eastern Star, an organization (established 1850) associated with Freemasonry, uses a pentagram as its symbol, with the five isosceles triangles of the points colored blue, yellow, white, green, and red. In most Grand Chapters, the pentagram is used pointing down, but in a few, it points up. Grand Chapter officers often have a pentagon inscribed around the star(the emblem shown here is from the Prince Hall Association).
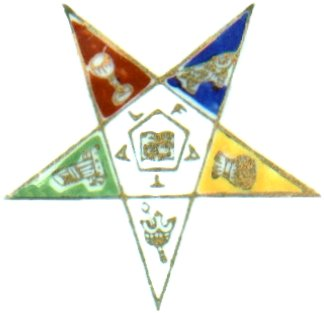
Order of the Eastern Star emblem
- A pentagram is featured on the flag of the Dutch city of Haaksbergen, as well on its coat of arms.
Flag of Haaksbergen
- A pentagram is featured on the flag of the Japanese city of Nagasaki, as well on its emblem.
Flag of Nagasaki

== Geometry ==
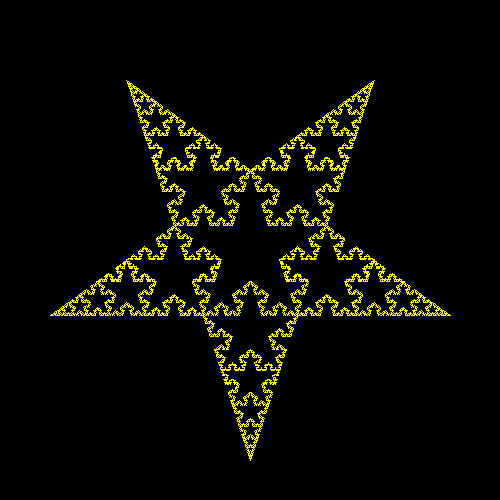
Koch snowflakes drawn with MSWLogo (in Tartapelago)

The pentagram is the simplest regular star polygon. The pentagram contains ten points (the five points of the star, and the five vertices of the inner pentagon) and fifteen line segments. It is represented by the Schläfli symbol {5/2}. Like a regular pentagon, and a regular pentagon with a pentagram constructed inside it, the regular pentagram has as its symmetry group the dihedral group of order 10.

It can be seen as a net of a pentagonal pyramid although with isosceles triangles.

=== Construction ===
The pentagram can be constructed by connecting alternate vertices of a pentagon; see details of the construction. It can also be constructed as a stellation of a pentagon, by extending the edges of a pentagon until the lines intersect.

=== Golden ratio ===
A regular pentagram colored to distinguish its line segments of different lengths; all are in golden ratio to one another.

Golden triangle
Large golden gnomon
Small golden gnomon

The golden ratio, $\varphi = \tfrac12\bigl(1 + \sqrt5~\!) = 2\cos 36^\circ,$ plays an important role in regular pentagons and pentagrams. Each intersection of edges sections the edges in the golden ratio: the ratio of the length of the edge to the longer segment is φ, as is the length of the longer segment to the shorter. Also, the ratio of the length of the shorter segment to the segment bounded by the two intersecting edges (a side of the pentagon in the pentagram's center) is φ. As the four-color illustration shows:
$$\frac{\color{red}\text{red}}{\color{green}\text{green}} = \frac{\color{green}\text{green}}{\color{blue}\text{blue}} = \frac{\color{blue}\text{blue}}{\color{magenta}\text{magenta}} = \varphi.$$

The pentagram includes ten isosceles triangles: five acute and five obtuse isosceles triangles. In all of them, the ratio of the longer side to the shorter side is φ. The acute triangles are golden triangles. The obtuse isosceles triangle highlighted via the colored lines in the illustration is a golden gnomon.

=== Trigonometric values ===
Drawing of a pentagram with notations of its angles.

$$\begin{align}
\sin \tfrac15 \pi & = \sin 36^\circ = \tfrac14 \sqrt{2(5 - \sqrt 5)} = \tfrac12 \sqrt{ \varphi^{-1}\sqrt5 } \\[5pt]
\cos \tfrac15 \pi & = \cos 36^\circ = \tfrac14 \bigl(\sqrt 5+1\bigr) = \tfrac12 \varphi \\[5pt]
\sin \tfrac25 \pi & = \sin 72^\circ = \tfrac14 \sqrt{2(5 + \sqrt 5)} = \tfrac12 \sqrt{\varphi\sqrt5 } \\[5pt]
\cos \tfrac25 \pi & = \cos 72^\circ = \tfrac14 \bigl(\sqrt 5 - 1\bigr)= \tfrac12 \varphi^{-1} \\[5pt]
\end{align}$$

As a result, in an isosceles triangle with one or two angles of 36°, the longer of the two side lengths is φ times that of the shorter of the two, both in the case of the acute as in the case of the obtuse triangle.

=== Spherical pentagram ===
A pentagram can be drawn as a star polygon on a sphere, composed of five great circle arcs, whose all internal angles are right angles. This shape was described by John Napier in his 1614 book Mirifici logarithmorum canonis descriptio (Description of the wonderful rule of logarithms) along with rules that link the values of trigonometric functions of five parts of a right spherical triangle (two angles and three sides). It was studied later by Carl Friedrich Gauss.

=== Three-dimensional figures ===
Several polyhedra incorporate pentagrams:

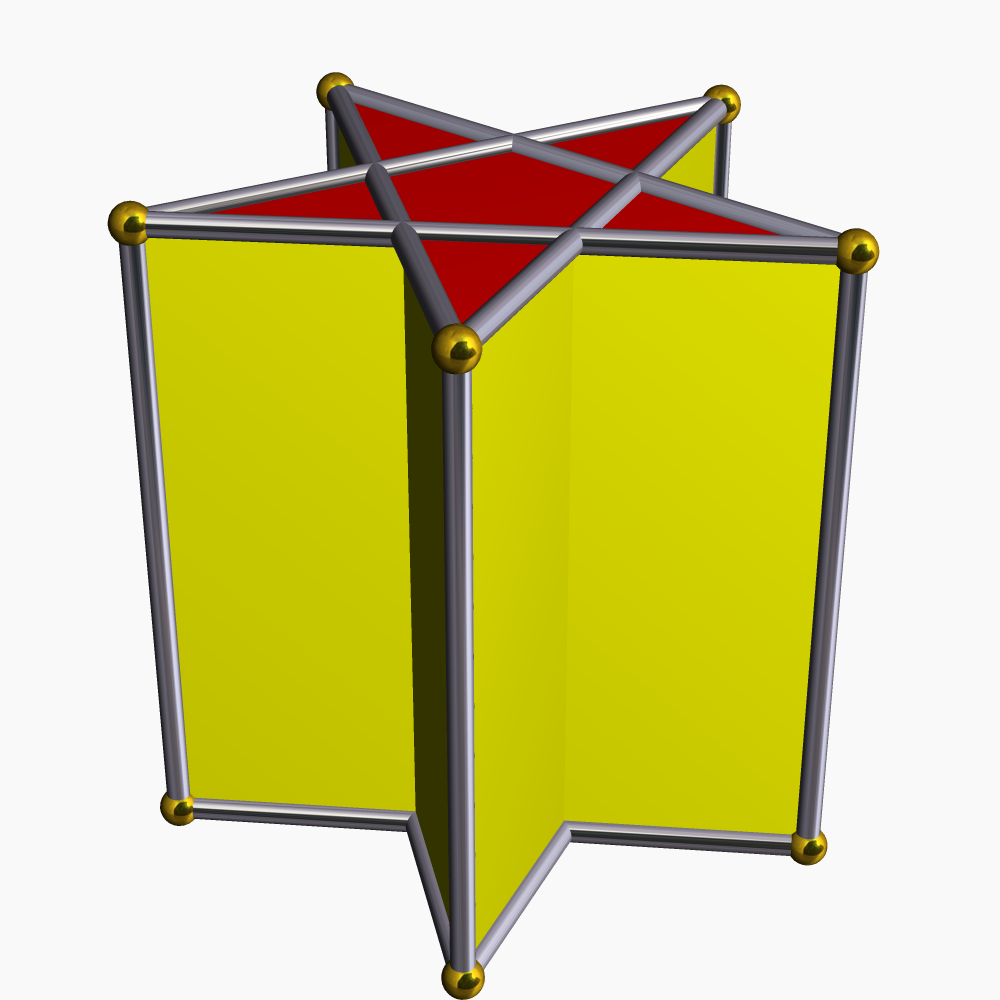
Pentagrammic prism

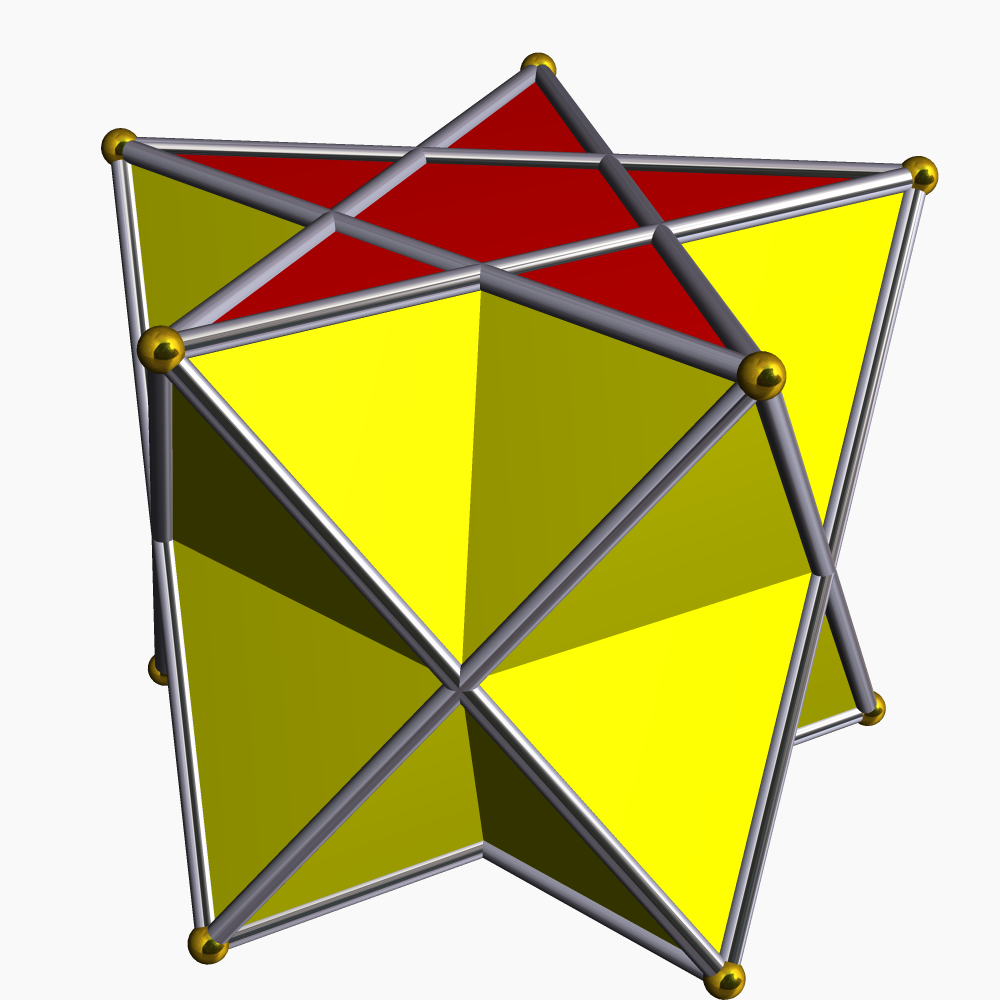
Pentagrammic antiprism

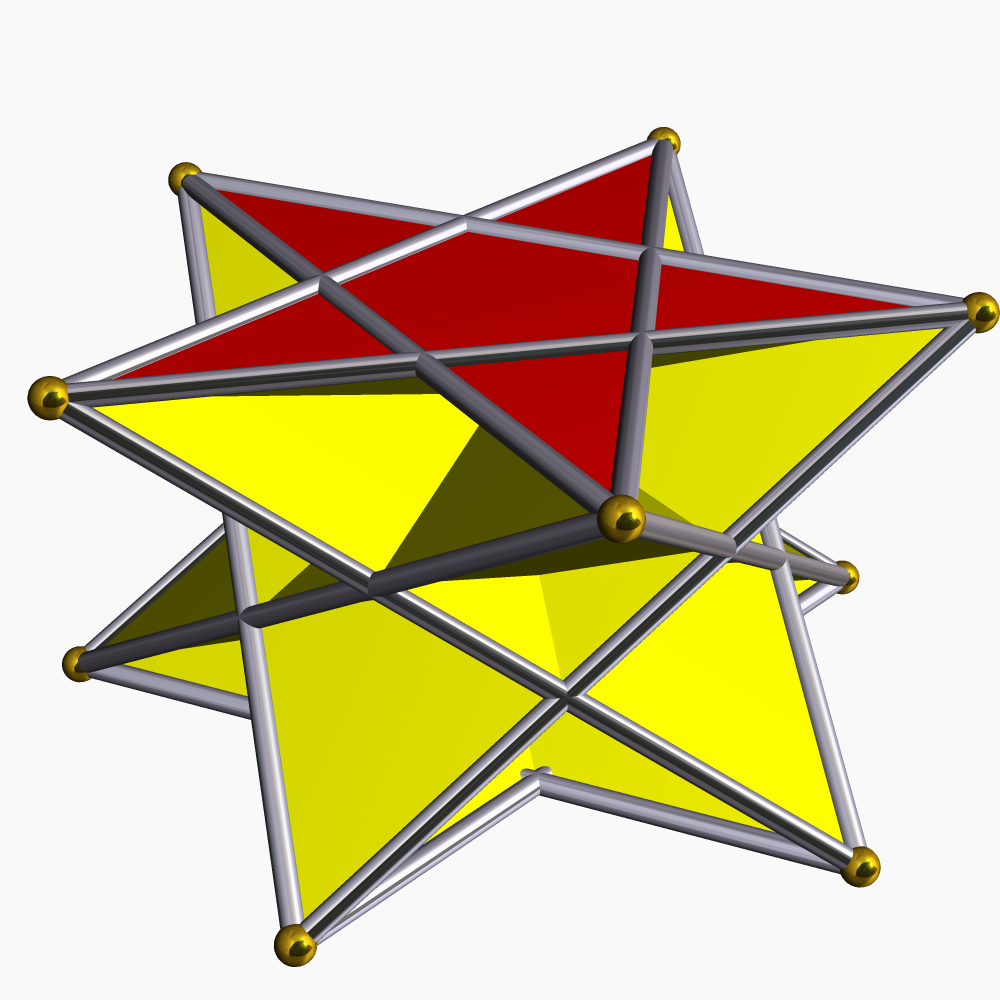
Pentagrammic crossed-antiprism

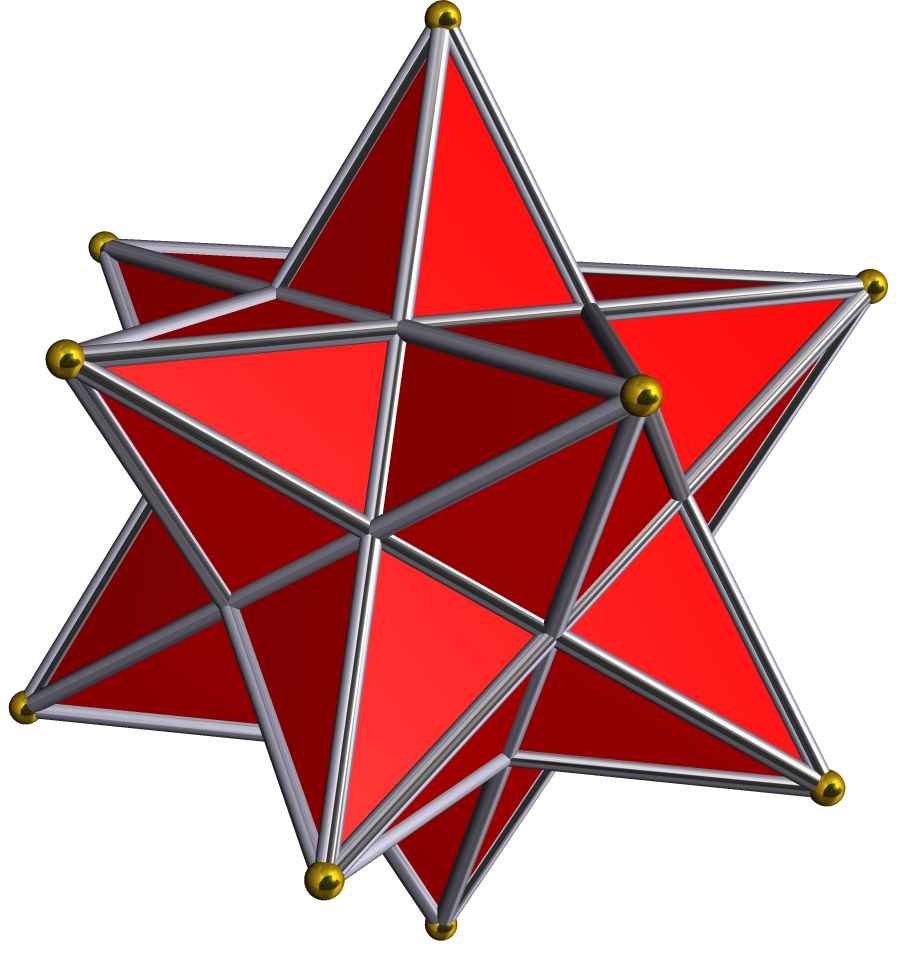
Small stellated dodecahedron

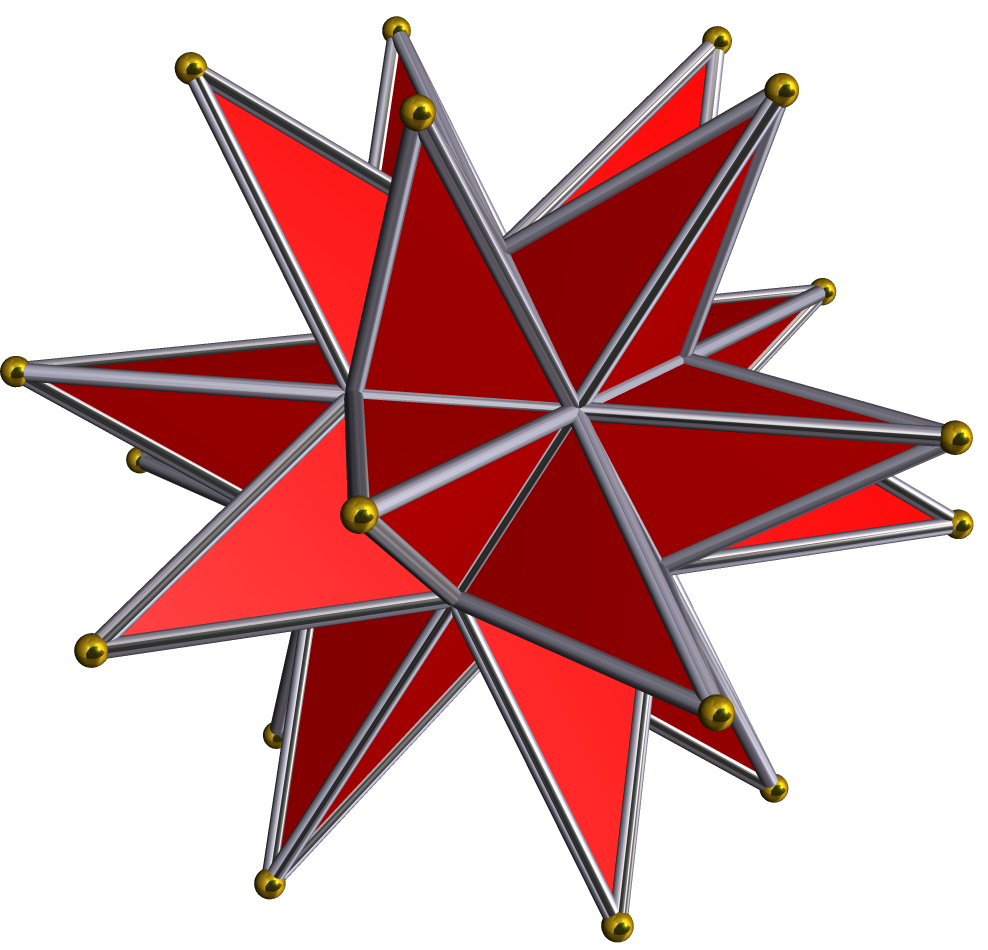
Great stellated dodecahedron

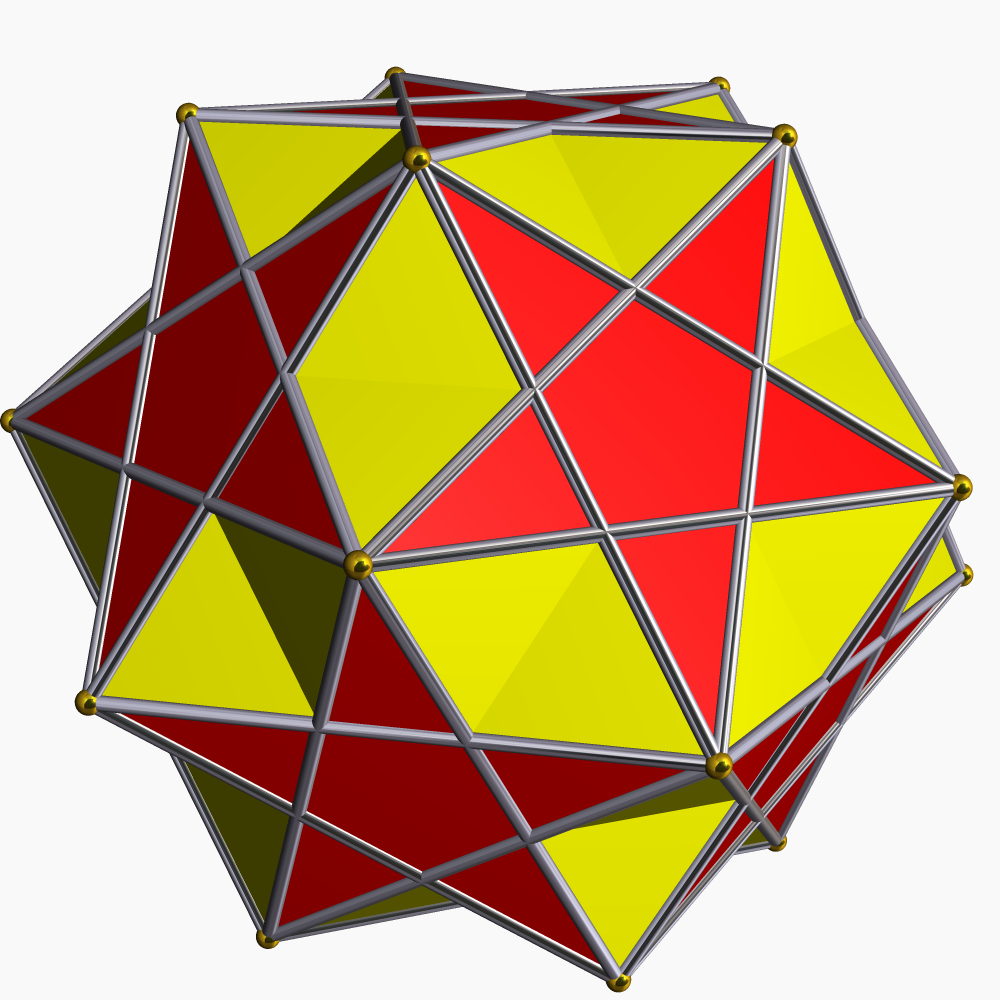
Small ditrigonal icosidodecahedron

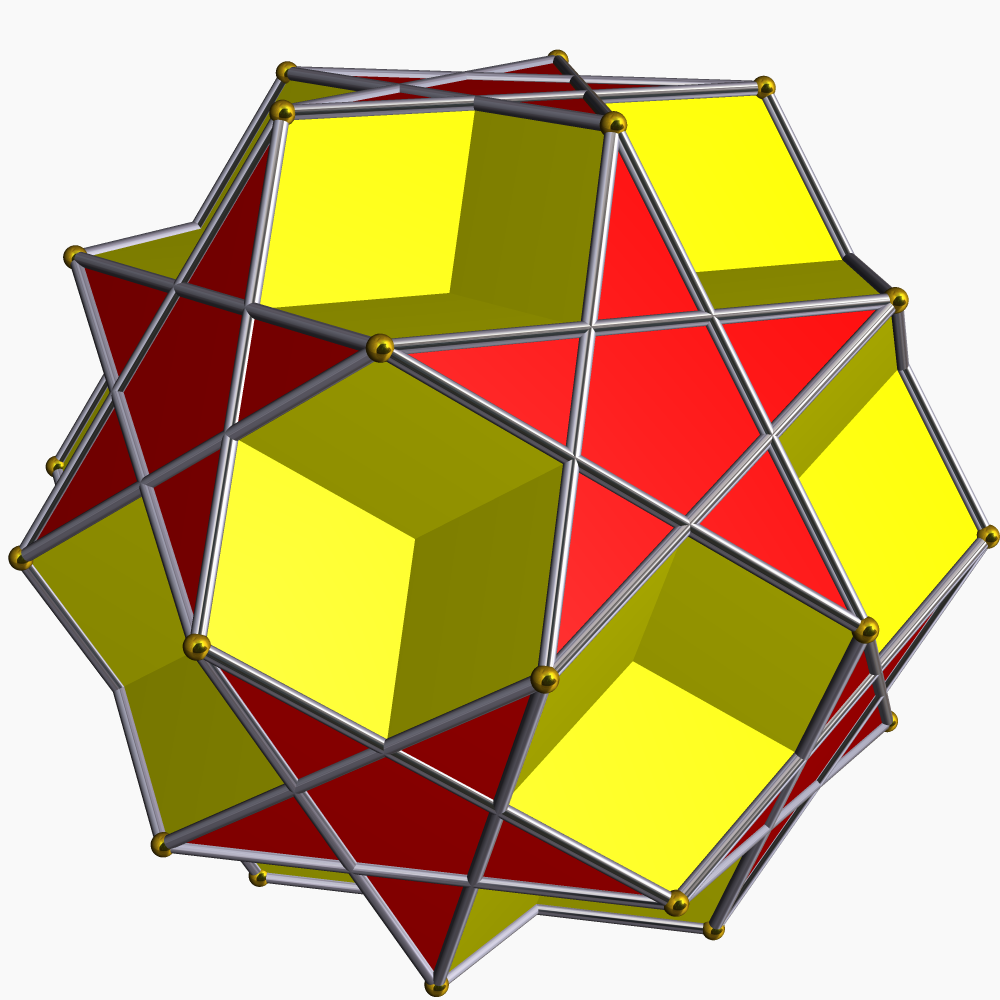
Dodecadodecahedron

=== Higher dimensions ===
Orthogonal projections of higher dimensional polytopes can also create pentagrammic figures:

| 4D | | 5D | |
|---|---|---|---|
| The regular 5-cell (4-simplex) has five vertices and 10 edges. | The rectified 5-cell has 10 vertices and 30 edges. | The rectified 5-simplex has 15 vertices, seen in this orthogonal projection as three nested pentagrams. | The birectified 5-simplex has 20 vertices, seen in this orthogonal projection as four overlapping pentagrams. |

All ten 4-dimensional Schläfli–Hess 4-polytopes have either pentagrammic faces or vertex figure elements.

== Pentagram of Venus ==
The pentagram of Venus

The pentagram of Venus is the apparent path of the planet Venus as observed from Earth. Successive inferior conjunctions of Venus repeat with an orbital resonance of approximately 13:8—that is, Venus orbits the Sun approximately 13 times for every eight orbits of Earth—shifting 144° at each inferior conjunction. The tips of the five loops at the center of the figure have the same geometric relationship to one another as the five vertices, or points, of a pentagram, and each group of five intersections equidistant from the figure's center have the same geometric relationship.

== In computer systems ==
The pentagram has these Unicode code points that enable them to be included in documents:

- U+26E4 ⛤ PENTAGRAM
- U+26E5 ⛥ RIGHT-HANDED INTERLACED PENTAGRAM
- U+26E6 ⛦ LEFT-HANDED INTERLACED PENTAGRAM
- U+26E7 ⛧ INVERTED PENTAGRAM

== See also ==
- Abe no Seimei – Japanese mystic
- Christian symbolism
- Command at Sea insignia – Badge in the US military
- Enneagram (geometry) – Nine-pointed star polygon
- Five-pointed star – Common ideogram in modern culture
- Heptagram – Star polygon with 7 sides
- Hexagram – Six-pointed star polygon
- Lute of Pythagoras – Self-similar geometric figure
- Medal of Honor – Highest award in the United States Armed Forces
- Pentachoron – the 4-simplex
- Pentagram map – Discrete dynamical system on polygons in the projective plane and on their moduli space
- Pentalpha – Puzzle involving stones and a pentagram
- Petersen graph – Cubic graph with 10 vertices and 15 edges
- Ptolemy's theorem – Relates the 4 sides and 2 diagonals of a quadrilateral with vertices on a common circle
- Seal of Solomon – Signet ring attributed to the Israelite king Solomon
- Star polygons in art and culture – Polygons as symbolic elements
- Star (heraldry) – Heraldic symbol
- Stellated polygons – Extending the elements of a polytope to form a new figure
