= Star polyhedron =

Polyhedron with some pattern of nonconvexity

In geometry, a star polyhedron is a polyhedron which has some repetitive quality of nonconvexity giving it a star-like visual quality.

There are two general kinds of star polyhedron:

- Polyhedra which self-intersect in a repetitive way.
- Concave polyhedra of a particular kind which alternate convex and concave or saddle vertices in a repetitive way. Mathematically these figures are examples of star domains.

Mathematical studies of star polyhedra are usually concerned with regular, uniform polyhedra, or the duals of the uniform polyhedra. All these stars are of the self-intersecting kind.

== Self-intersecting star polyhedra ==
=== Regular star polyhedra ===
The regular star polyhedra are self-intersecting polyhedra. They may either have self-intersecting faces, or self-intersecting vertex figures.

There are four regular star polyhedra, known as the Kepler–Poinsot polyhedra. The Schläfli symbol {p,q} implies faces with p sides, and vertex figures with q sides. Two of them have pentagrammic {5/2} faces and two have pentagrammic vertex figures.

These images show each form with a single face colored yellow to show the visible portion of that face.

There are also an infinite number of regular star dihedra and hosohedra {2,p/q} and {p/q,2} for any star polygon {p/q}. While degenerate in Euclidean space, they can be realised spherically in nondegenerate form.

=== Uniform and uniform dual star polyhedra ===
There are many uniform star polyhedra including two infinite series, of prisms and of antiprisms, and their duals.

The uniform and dual uniform star polyhedra are also self-intersecting polyhedra. They may either have self-intersecting faces, or self-intersecting vertex figures or both.

The uniform star polyhedra have regular faces or regular star polygon faces. The dual uniform star polyhedra have regular faces or regular star polygon vertex figures.

Example uniform polyhedra and their duals
Uniform polyhedron	Dual polyhedron
The pentagrammic prism is a prismatic star polyhedron. It is composed of two pentagram faces connected by five intersecting square faces.	The pentagrammic dipyramid is also a star polyhedron, representing the dual to the pentagrammic prism. It is face-transitive, composed of ten intersecting isosceles triangles.
The great dodecicosahedron is a star polyhedron, constructed from a single vertex figure of intersecting hexagonal and decagrammic, {10/3}, faces.	The great dodecicosacron is the dual to the great dodecicosahedron. It is face-transitive, composed of 60 intersecting bow-tie-shaped quadrilateral faces.

=== Stellations and facettings ===
Beyond the forms above, there are unlimited classes of self-intersecting (star) polyhedra.

Two important classes are the stellations of convex polyhedra and their duals, the facettings of the dual polyhedra.

For example, the complete stellation of the icosahedron (illustrated) can be interpreted as a self-intersecting polyhedron composed of 20 identical faces, each a (9/4) wound polygon. Below is an illustration of this polyhedron with one face drawn in yellow.

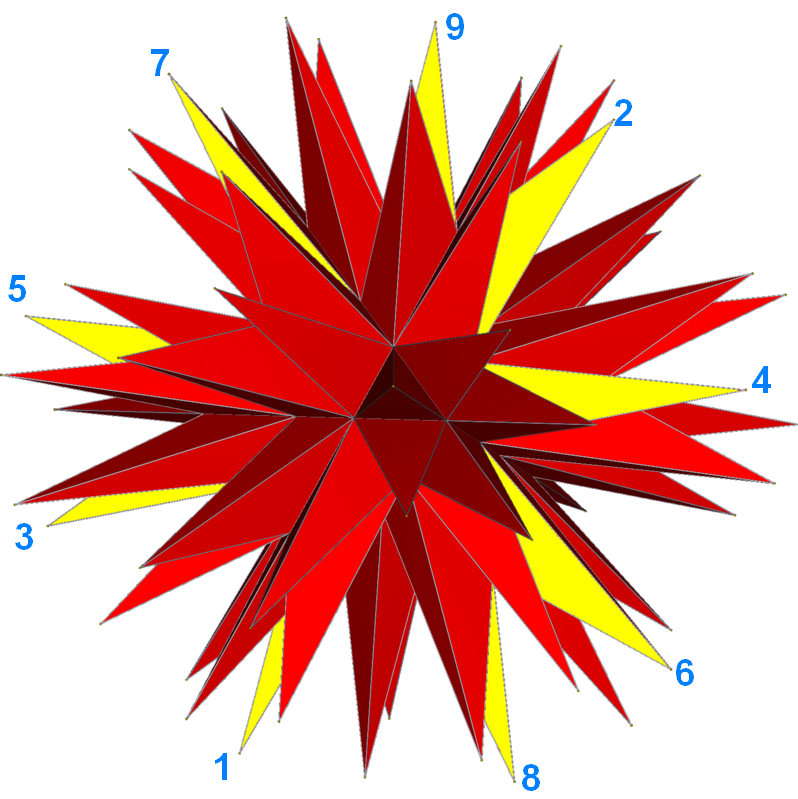

=== Star polytopes ===
A similarly self-intersecting polytope in any number of dimensions is called a star polytope.

A regular polytope {p,q,r,...,s,t} is a star polytope if either its facet {p,q,...s} or its vertex figure {q,r,...,s,t} is a star polytope.

In four dimensions, the 10 regular star polychora are called the Schläfli–Hess polychora. Analogous to the regular star polyhedra, these 10 are all composed of facets which are either one of the five regular Platonic solids or one of the four regular star Kepler–Poinsot polyhedra.

For example, the great grand stellated 120-cell, projected orthogonally into 3-space, looks like this:

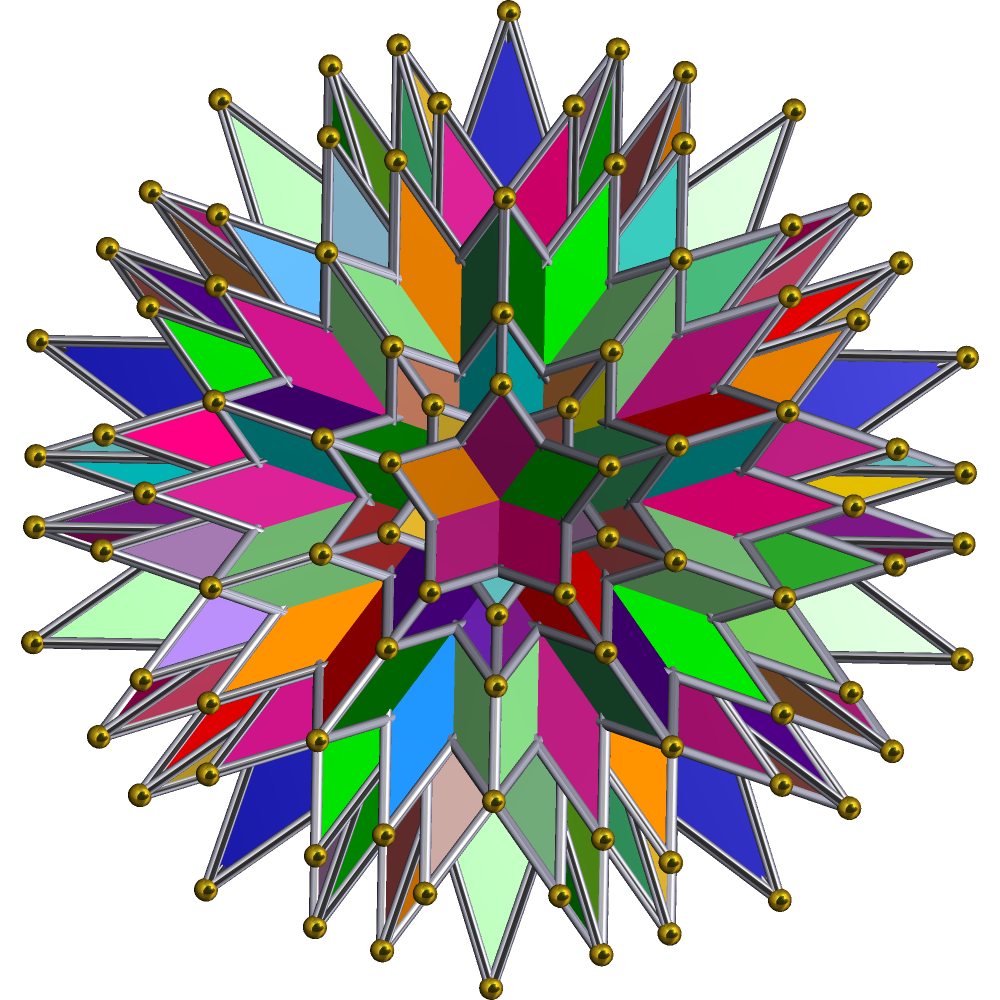

There are no regular star polytopes in dimensions higher than 4.

== Star-domain star polyhedra ==
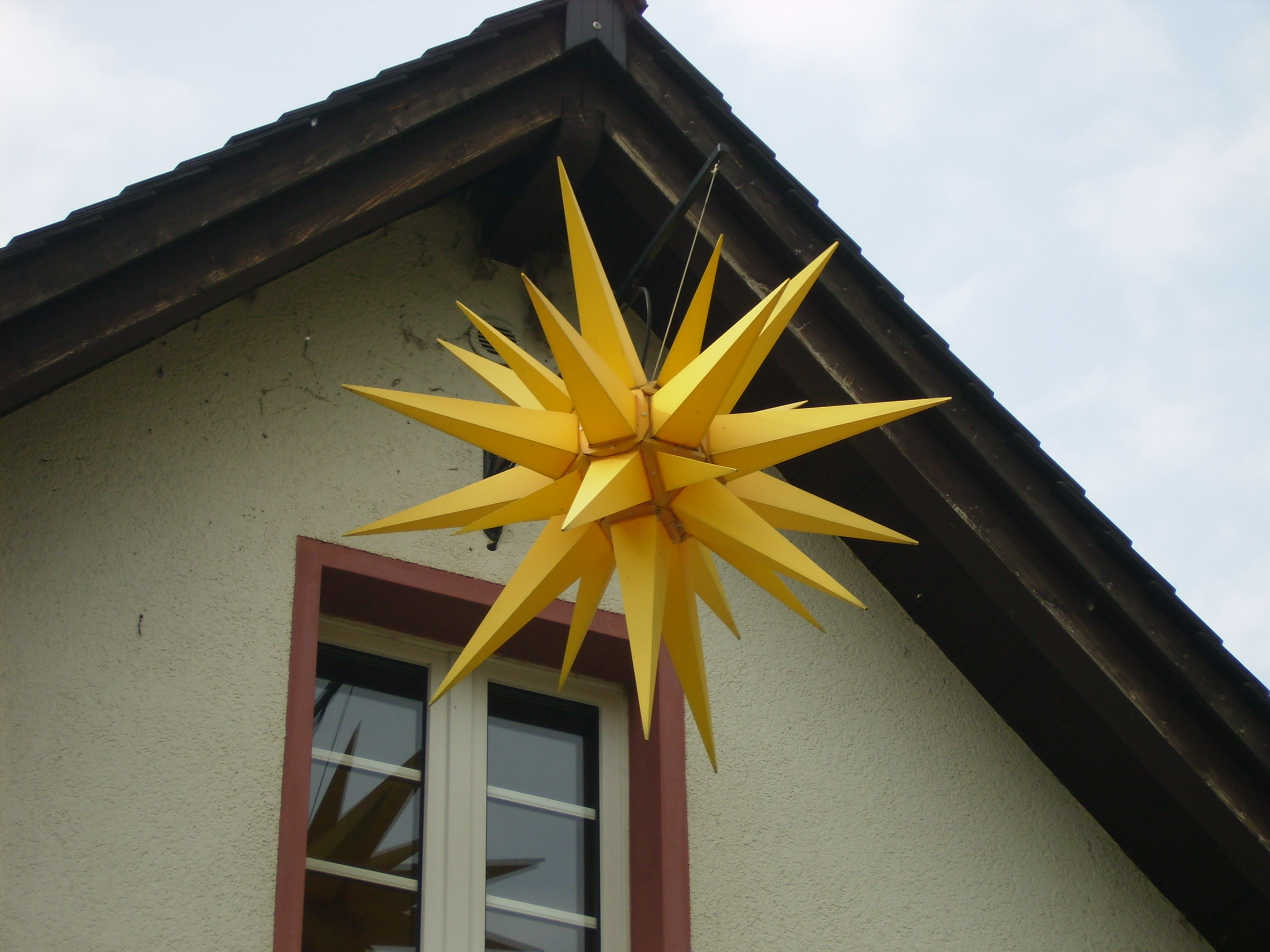
A Moravian star hung outside a church

A polyhedron which does not cross itself, such that all of the interior can be seen from one interior point, is an example of a star domain. The visible exterior portions of many self-intersecting star polyhedra form the boundaries of star domains, but despite their similar appearance, as abstract polyhedra these are different structures. For instance, the small stellated dodecahedron has 12 pentagram faces, but the corresponding star domain has 60 isosceles triangle faces, and correspondingly different numbers of vertices and edges.

Polyhedral star domains appear in various types of architecture, usually religious in nature. For example, they are seen on many baroque churches as symbols of the Pope who built the church, on Hungarian churches and on other religious buildings. These stars can also be used as decorations. Moravian stars are used for both purposes and can be constructed in various forms.

== See also ==
- Star polygon
- Stellation
- Polyhedral compound
- List of uniform polyhedra
- List of uniform polyhedra by Schwarz triangle
