= Antiprism =

Polyhedron with parallel bases connected by triangles

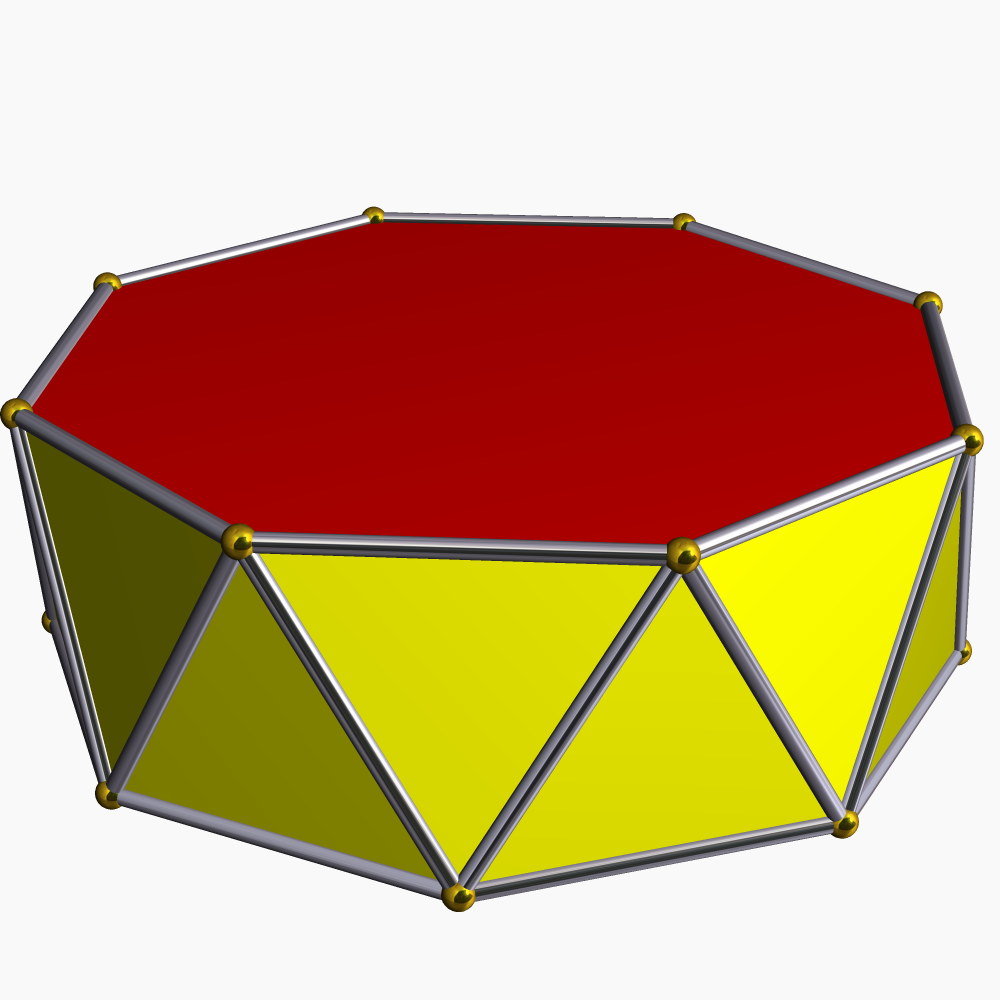
Octagonal antiprism

In geometry, an n-gonal antiprism or n-antiprism is a polyhedron composed of two parallel direct copies (not mirror images) of an n-sided polygon, connected by an alternating band of 2n triangles. They are represented by the Conway notation An.

Antiprisms are a subclass of prismatoids, and are a (degenerate) type of snub polyhedron.

Antiprisms are similar to prisms, except that the bases are twisted relatively to each other, and that the side faces (connecting the bases) are 2n triangles, rather than n quadrilaterals.

The dual polyhedron of an n-gonal antiprism is an n-gonal trapezohedron.

== History ==
In his 1619 book Harmonices Mundi, Johannes Kepler observed the existence of the infinite family of antiprisms. This has conventionally been thought of as the first discovery of these shapes, but they may have been known earlier: an unsigned printing block for the net of a hexagonal antiprism has been attributed to Hieronymus Andreae, who died in 1556.

The German form of the word "antiprism" was used for these shapes in the 19th century; Karl Heinze credits its introduction to Theodor Wittstein. Although the English "anti-prism" had been used earlier for an optical prism used to cancel the effects of a primary optical element, the first use of "antiprism" in English in its geometric sense appears to be in the early 20th century in the works of H. S. M. Coxeter.

== Special cases ==
=== Right antiprism ===
For an antiprism with regular n-gon bases, one usually considers the case where these two copies are twisted by an angle of 180/n degrees. The axis of a regular polygon is the line perpendicular to the polygon plane and lying in the polygon centre.

For an antiprism with congruent regular n-gon bases, twisted by an angle of 180/n degrees, more regularity is obtained if the bases have the same axis: are coaxial; i.e. (for non-coplanar bases): if the line connecting the base centers is perpendicular to the base planes. Then the antiprism is called a right antiprism, and its 2n side faces are isosceles triangles.

The symmetry group of a right n-antiprism is D_{nd} of order 4n known as an antiprismatic symmetry, because it could be obtained by rotation of the bottom half of a prism by $\pi/n$ in relation to the top half. A concave polyhedron created in this way would have this symmetry group, hence prefix "anti" before "prismatic". There are two exceptions having groups different than D_{nd}:

- n = 2: the regular tetrahedron, which has the larger symmetry group T_{d} of order 24, which has three versions of D_{2d} as subgroups;
- n = 3: the regular octahedron, which has the larger symmetry group O_{h} of order 48, which has four versions of D_{3d} as subgroups.

If a right 2- or 3-antiprism is not uniform, then its symmetry group is D_{2d} or D_{3d} as usual.
The symmetry group contains inversion if and only if n is odd.

The rotation group is D_{n} of order 2n, except in the cases of:

- n = 2: the regular tetrahedron, which has the larger rotation group T of order 12, which has only one subgroup D_{2};
- n = 3: the regular octahedron, which has the larger rotation group O of order 24, which has four versions of D_{3} as subgroups.

If a right 2- or 3-antiprism is not uniform, then its rotation group is D_{2} or D_{3} as usual.
The right n-antiprisms have congruent regular n-gon bases and congruent isosceles triangle side faces, thus have the same (dihedral) symmetry group as the uniform n-antiprism, for n ≥ 4.

Cartesian coordinates for the vertices of a right n-antiprism (i.e. with regular n-gon bases and 2n isosceles triangle side faces, circumradius of the bases equal to 1) are:

$$\left( \cos\frac{k\pi}{n}, \sin\frac{k\pi}{n}, (-1)^k h \right)$$

where 0 ≤ k ≤ 2n – 1;

if the n-antiprism is uniform (i.e. if the triangles are equilateral), then:
$$2h^2 = \cos\frac{\pi}{n} - \cos\frac{2\pi}{n}.$$

=== Uniform antiprism ===
A uniform n-antiprism has two congruent regular n-gons as base faces, and 2n equilateral triangles as side faces. As do uniform prisms, the uniform antiprisms form an infinite class of vertex-transitive polyhedra. For n = 2, one has the digonal antiprism (degenerate antiprism), which is visually identical to the regular tetrahedron; for n = 3, the regular octahedron is a triangular antiprism (non-degenerate antiprism).

Family of uniform n-gonal antiprisms
Antiprism name	Digonal antiprism	(Trigonal) Triangular antiprism	(Tetragonal) Square antiprism	Pentagonal antiprism	Hexagonal antiprism	Heptagonal antiprism	...	Apeirogonal antiprism
Polyhedron image							...	
Spherical tiling image							Plane tiling image	
Vertex config.	2.3.3.3	3.3.3.3	4.3.3.3	5.3.3.3	6.3.3.3	7.3.3.3	...	∞.3.3.3

The Schlegel diagrams of these semiregular antiprisms are as follows:

A3	A4	A5	A6	A7	A8

== Properties ==
=== Volume and surface area ===
Let a be the edge-length of a uniform n-gonal antiprism; then the volume is:
$$V = \frac{n\sqrt{4\cos^2\frac{\pi}{2n}-1}\sin \frac{3\pi}{2n} }{12\sin^2\frac{\pi}{n}}~a^3,$$
and the surface area is:
$$A = \frac{n}{2} \left( \cot\frac{\pi}{n} + \sqrt{3} \right) a^2.$$
Furthermore, the volume of a regular right n-gonal antiprism with side length of its bases l and height h is given by:
$$V = \frac{nhl^2}{12} \left( \csc\frac{\pi}{n} + 2\cot\frac{\pi}{n}\right).$$

==== Derivation ====
The circumradius of the horizontal circumcircle of the regular $n$-gon at the base is

$$R(0) = \frac{l}{2\sin\frac{\pi}{n}}.$$

The vertices at the base are at

$$\left(\begin{array}{c}R(0)\cos\frac{2\pi m}{n} \\ R(0)\sin\frac{2\pi m}{n} \\ 0\end{array}\right),\quad  m=0..n-1;$$

the vertices at the top are at

$$\left(\begin{array}{c}R(0)\cos\frac{2\pi (m+1/2)}{n}\\R(0)\sin\frac{2\pi (m+1/2)}{n}\\h\end{array}\right), \quad m=0..n-1.$$

Via linear interpolation, points on the outer triangular edges of the antiprism that connect vertices at the bottom with vertices at the top are at

$$\left(\begin{array}{c}
\frac{R(0)}{h}[(h-z)\cos\frac{2\pi m}{n}+z\cos\frac{\pi(2m+1)}{n}]\\
\frac{R(0)}{h}[(h-z)\sin\frac{2\pi m}{n}+z\sin\frac{\pi(2m+1)}{n}]\\
\\z\end{array}\right), \quad 0\le z\le h, m=0..n-1$$

and at

$$\left(\begin{array}{c}
\frac{R(0)}{h}[(h-z)\cos\frac{2\pi (m+1)}{n}+z\cos\frac{\pi(2m+1)}{n}]\\
\frac{R(0)}{h}[(h-z)\sin\frac{2\pi (m+1)}{n}+z\sin\frac{\pi(2m+1)}{n}]\\
\\z\end{array}\right), \quad 0\le z\le h, m=0..n-1.$$

By building the sums of the squares of the $x$ and $y$ coordinates in one of the previous two vectors, the squared circumradius of this section at altitude $z$ is

$$R(z)^2 = \frac{R(0)^2}{h^2}[h^2-2hz+2z^2+2z(h-z)\cos\frac{\pi}{n}].$$

The horizontal section at altitude $0\le z\le h$ above the base is a $2n$-gon (truncated $n$-gon) with $n$ sides of length $l_1(z)=l(1-z/h)$ alternating with $n$ sides of length $l_2(z)=lz/h$. (These are derived from the length of the difference of the previous two vectors.) It can be dissected into $n$ isoceless triangles of edges $R(z),R(z)$ and $l_1$ (semiperimeter $R(z)+l_1(z)/2$) plus $n$ isoceless triangles of edges $R(z),R(z)$ and $l_2(z)$ (semiperimeter $R(z)+l_2(z)/2$). According to Heron's formula the areas of these triangles are

$$Q_1(z) = \frac{R(0)^2}{h^2} (h-z)\left[(h-z)\cos\frac{\pi}{n}+z\right] \sin\frac{\pi}{n}$$

and

$$Q_2(z) =
\frac{R(0)^2}{h^2} z\left[z\cos\frac{\pi}{n}+h-z\right] \sin\frac{\pi}{n}
.$$

The area of the section is $n[Q_1(z)+Q_2(z)]$, and the volume is

$$V = n\int_0^h [Q_1(z)+Q_2(z)] dz
= \frac{nh}{3}R(0)^2\sin\frac{\pi}{n}(1+2\cos\frac{\pi}{n})
= \frac{nh}{12}l^2\frac{1+2\cos\frac{\pi}{n}}{\sin\frac{\pi}{n}}
.$$

The volume of a right n-gonal prism with the same l and h is:
$$V_{\mathrm{prism}}=\frac{nhl^2}{4} \cot\frac{\pi}{n}$$
which is smaller than that of an antiprism.

== Generalizations ==
=== In higher dimensions ===
Four-dimensional antiprisms can be defined as having two dual polyhedra as parallel opposite faces, so that each three-dimensional face between them comes from two dual parts of the polyhedra: a vertex and a dual polygon, or two dual edges. Every three-dimensional convex polyhedron is combinatorially equivalent to one of the two opposite faces of a four-dimensional antiprism, constructed from its canonical polyhedron and its polar dual. However, there exist four-dimensional polychora that cannot be combined with their duals to form five-dimensional antiprisms.

=== Self-crossing polyhedra ===
3/2-antiprism nonuniform	5/4-antiprism nonuniform	5/2-antiprism	5/3-antiprism
9/2-antiprism	9/4-antiprism	9/5-antiprism	

Uniform star antiprisms are named by their star polygon bases, {p/q}, and exist in prograde and in retrograde (crossed) solutions. Crossed forms have intersecting vertex figures, and are denoted by "inverted" fractions: p/(p – q) instead of p/q; example: (5/3) instead of (5/2).

A right star n-antiprism has two congruent coaxial regular convex or star polygon base faces, and 2n isosceles triangle side faces.

Any star antiprism with regular convex or star polygon bases can be made a right star antiprism (by translating and/or twisting one of its bases, if necessary).

All the non-star and star uniform antiprisms up to 15 sides, together with those of a 29-gon (or icosaenneagon). For example, the icosaenneagrammic crossed antiprism (29/q) with the greatest q, such that it can be uniform, has q = 19 and is depicted at the bottom right corner of the image. For q ≥ 20 up to 28 the crossed antiprism cannot be uniform. Note: Octagrammic crossed antiprism (8/5) is missing.

In the retrograde forms, but not in the prograde forms, the triangles joining the convex or star bases intersect the axis of rotational symmetry. Thus:

- Retrograde star antiprisms with regular convex polygon bases cannot have all equal edge lengths, and so cannot be uniform. "Exception": a retrograde star antiprism with equilateral triangle bases (vertex configuration: 3.3/2.3.3) can be uniform; but then, it has the appearance of an equilateral triangle: it is a degenerate star polyhedron.
- Similarly, some retrograde star antiprisms with regular star polygon bases cannot have all equal edge lengths, and so cannot be uniform. Example: a retrograde star antiprism with regular star {7/5}-gon bases (vertex configuration: 3.3.3.7/5) cannot be uniform.

Also, star antiprism compounds with regular star {p/q}-gon bases can be constructed if p and q have common factors. Example: a star (10/4)-antiprism is the compound of two star (5/2)-antiprisms.

The dual of a (p/q) antiprism with q < p/2 is a p/q-trapezohedron, and the dual of a (p/q) antiprism with q > p/2, i.e. crossed antiprism, is a (p/q) concave trapezohedron, where "concave" refers to 2-dimensional faces of the 3D solid.

==== Number of uniform crossed antiprisms ====
If the notation (p/q) is used for an antiprism, then for q > p/2 the antiprism is crossed (by definition) and for q < p/2 is not. In this section all antiprisms are assumed to be non-degenerate, i.e. p ≥ 3, q ≠ p/2. Also, the condition (p,q) = 1 (p and q are relatively prime) holds, as compounds are excluded from counting. The number of uniform crossed antiprisms for fixed p can be determined using simple inequalities. The condition on possible q is

p/2 < q < 2/3 p and (p,q) = 1.

Examples:

- p = 3: 2 ≤ q ≤ 1 – a uniform triangular crossed antiprism does not exist.
- p = 5: 3 ≤ q ≤ 3 – one antiprism of the type (5/3) can be uniform.
- p = 29: 15 ≤ q ≤ 19 – there are five possibilities (15 thru 19) shown in the rightmost column, below the (29/1) convex antiprism, on the image above.
- p = 15: 8 ≤ q ≤ 9 – antiprism with q = 8 is a solution, but q = 9 must be rejected, as (15,9) = 3 and 15/9 = 5/3. The antiprism (15/9) is a compound of three antiprisms (5/3). Since 9 satisfies the inequalities, the compound can be uniform, and if it is, then its parts must be. Indeed, the antiprism (5/3) can be uniform by example 2.

In the first column of the following table, the symbols are Schoenflies, Coxeter, and orbifold notation, in this order.

Star (p/q)-antiprisms by symmetry, for p ≤ 12
Symmetry group	Uniform stars (acronym)			Right stars
D_{3h} [2,3] (2*3)				3.3/2.3.3; Crossed triangular antiprism
D_{4d} [2^{+},8] (2*4)				3.3/2.3.4; Crossed square antiprism
D_{5h} [2,5] (*225)	3.3.3.5/2; Pentagrammic antiprism (stap)			3.3/2.3.5; Crossed pentagonal antiprism
D_{5d} [2^{+},10] (2*5)	3.3.3.5/3; Pentagrammic crossed antiprism (starp)			
D_{6d} [2^{+},12] (2*6)				3.3/2.3.6; Crossed hexagonal antiprism
D_{7h} [2,7] (*227)	3.3.3.7/2; Heptagrammic antiprism (7/2) (shap)	3.3.3.7/4; Heptagrammic crossed antiprism (7/4) (gisharp)		
D_{7d} [2^{+},14] (2*7)	3.3.3.7/3; Heptagrammic antiprism (7/3) (gishap)			
D_{8d} [2^{+},16] (2*8)	3.3.3.8/3; Octagrammic antiprism (stoap)	3.3.3.8/5; Octagrammic crossed antiprism (storp)		
D_{9h} [2,9] (*229)	3.3.3.9/2; Enneagrammic antiprism (9/2) (steap)	3.3.3.9/4; Enneagrammic antiprism (9/4) (gisteap)		
D_{9d} [2^{+},18] (2*9)	3.3.3.9/5; Enneagrammic crossed antiprism (gisterp)			
D_{10d} [2^{+},20] (2*10)	3.3.3.10/3; Decagrammic antiprism (stidap)			
D_{11h} [2,11] (*2.2.11)	3.3.3.11/2; Undecagrammic (11/2)	3.3.3.11/4; Undecagrammic (11/4)	3.3.3.11/6; Undecagrammic crossed (11/6)	
D_{11d} [2^{+},22] (2*11)	3.3.3.11/3; Undecagrammic (11/3)	3.3.3.11/5; Undecagrammic (11/5)	3.3.3.11/7; Undecagrammic crossed (11/7)	
D_{12d} [2^{+},24] (2*12)	3.3.3.12/5; Dodecagrammic	3.3.3.12/7; Dodecagrammic crossed		
...	...			

== See also ==
- Antiprism graph, graph of an antiprism
- Grand antiprism, a four-dimensional polytope
- Skew polygon, a three-dimensional polygon whose convex hull is an antiprism
