= 14 (number) =

Natural number, composite number

← 13	14	15 →
- ← 10 11 12 13 14 15 16 17 18 19 →: List of numbers; Integers; ← 0 10 20 30 40 50 60 70 80 90 →
- Cardinal: fourteen
- Ordinal: 14th (fourteenth)
- Numeral system: tetradecimal
- Factorization: 2 × 7
- Divisors: 1, 2, 7, 14
- Greek numeral: ΙΔ´
- Roman numeral: XIV, xiv
- Greek prefix: tetrakaideca-
- Latin prefix: quattuordec-
- Binary: 1110_{2}
- Ternary: 112_{3}
- Senary: 22_{6}
- Octal: 16_{8}
- Duodecimal: 12_{12}
- Hexadecimal: E_{16}
- Hebrew numeral: י"ד
- Babylonian numeral: 𒌋𒐘

14 (fourteen) is the natural number following 13 and preceding 15.

== Mathematics ==
=== Properties ===
14 is the third distinct semiprime, being the third of the form $2 \times q$ (where $q$ is a higher prime). More specifically, it is the first member of the second cluster of two discrete semiprimes (14, 15); the next such cluster is (21, 22), members whose sum is the fourteenth prime number, 43.

14 has an aliquot sum of 10, within an aliquot sequence of two composite numbers (14, 10, 8, 7, 1, 0) in the prime 7-aliquot tree.

14 is the third companion Pell number and the fourth Catalan number. It is the lowest even $n$ for which the Euler totient $\varphi(x) = n$ has no solution, making it the first even nontotient.

According to the Shapiro inequality, 14 is the least number $n$ such that there exist $x_{1}$, $x_{2}$, $x_{3}$, where:

$$\sum_{i=1}^{n} \frac{x_i}{x_{i+1}+x_{i+2}} < \frac{n}{2},$$

with $x_{n+1} = x_{1}$ and $x_{n+2} = x_{2}.$

A set of real numbers to which it is applied closure and complement operations in any possible sequence generates 14 distinct sets. This holds even if the reals are replaced by a more general topological space; see Kuratowski's closure-complement problem.

There are fourteen even numbers that cannot be expressed as the sum of two odd composite numbers:

$$\{2, 4, 6, 8, 10, 12, 14, 16, 20, 22, 26, 28, 32, 38\}$$

where 14 is the seventh such number.

==== Polygons ====
There are fourteen equilateral triangles formed by the sides and diagonals of a regular six-sided hexagon. In a hexagonal lattice, there are fourteen fixed two-dimensional triangular-celled polyiamonds with four cells.

There are fourteen elements in a regular heptagon (where there are seven vertices and edges), and the total number of diagonals between all its vertices.

There are fourteen polygons that can fill a plane-vertex tiling, where five polygons tile the plane uniformly, and nine others only tile the plane alongside irregular polygons.

The fundamental domain of the Klein quartic is a regular hyperbolic 14-sided tetradecagon, with an area of $8\pi$.

The Klein quartic is a compact Riemann surface of genus 3 that has the largest possible automorphism group order of its kind (of order 168) whose fundamental domain is a regular hyperbolic 14-sided tetradecagon, with an area of $8\pi$ by the Gauss-Bonnet theorem.

==== Solids ====
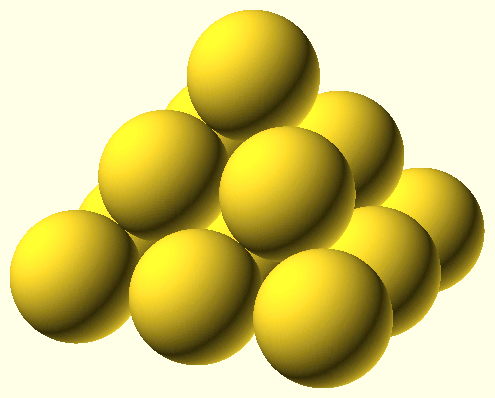
14 is a square pyramidal number.

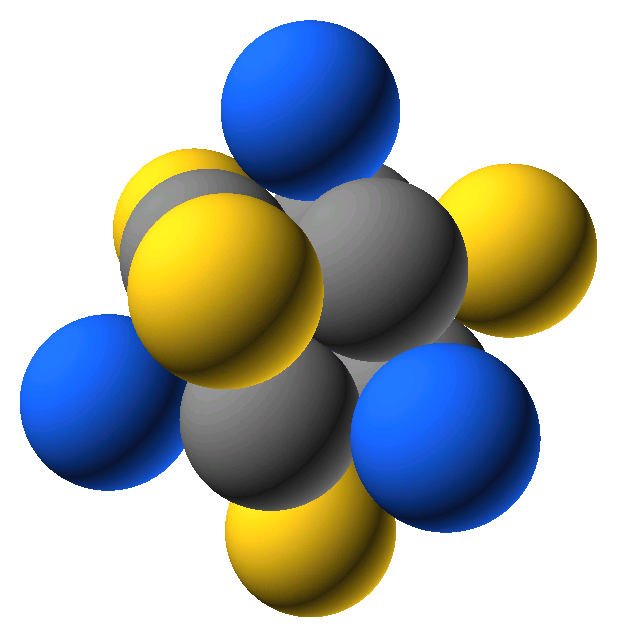
14 is a stella octangula number.

Several distinguished polyhedra in three dimensions contain fourteen faces or vertices as facets:

- The cuboctahedron, one of two quasiregular polyhedra, has 14 faces and is the only uniform polyhedron with radial equilateral symmetry.
- The rhombic dodecahedron, dual to the cuboctahedron, contains 14 vertices and is the only Catalan solid that can tessellate space.
- The truncated octahedron contains 14 faces, is the permutohedron of order four, and the only Archimedean solid to tessellate space.
- The dodecagonal prism, which is the largest prism that can tessellate space alongside other uniform prisms, has 14 faces.
- The Szilassi polyhedron and its dual, the Császár polyhedron, are the simplest toroidal polyhedra; they have 14 vertices and 14 triangular faces, respectively.
- Steffen's polyhedron, the simplest flexible polyhedron without self-crossings, has 14 triangular faces.

A regular tetrahedron cell, the simplest uniform polyhedron and Platonic solid, is made up of a total of 14 elements: 4 edges, 6 vertices, and 4 faces.

- Szilassi's polyhedron and the tetrahedron are the only two known polyhedra where each face shares an edge with each other face, while Császár's polyhedron and the tetrahedron are the only two known polyhedra with a continuous manifold boundary that do not contain any diagonals.
- Two tetrahedra that are joined by a common edge whose four adjacent and opposite faces are replaced with two specific seven-faced crinkles will create a new flexible polyhedron, with a total of 14 possible clashes where faces can meet.^{pp.10-11,14} This is the second simplest known triangular flexible polyhedron, after Steffen's polyhedron.^{p.16} If three tetrahedra are joined at two separate opposing edges and made into a single flexible polyhedron, called a 2-dof flexible polyhedron, each hinge will only have a total range of motion of 14 degrees.^{p.139}

14 is also the root (non-unitary) trivial stella octangula number, where two self-dual tetrahedra are represented through figurate numbers, while also being the first non-trivial square pyramidal number (after 5); the simplest of the ninety-two Johnson solids is the square pyramid $J_{1}.$ (Note: Furthermore, the square pyramid can be attached to uniform and non-uniform polyhedra (such as other Johnson solids) to generate fourteen other Johnson solids: J_{8}, J_{10}, J_{15}, J_{17}, J_{49}, J_{50}, J_{51}, J_{52}, J_{53}, J_{54}, J_{55}, J_{56}, J_{57}, and J_{87}.) There are a total of fourteen semi-regular polyhedra, when the pseudorhombicuboctahedron is included as a non-vertex transitive Archimedean solid (a lower class of polyhedra that follow the five Platonic solids). (Note: Where the tetrahedron — which is self-dual, inscribable inside all other Platonic solids, and vice versa — contains fourteen elements, there exist thirteen uniform polyhedra that contain fourteen faces (U_{09}, U_{76i}, U_{08}, U_{77c}, U_{07}), vertices (U_{76d}, U_{77d}, U_{78b}, U_{78c}, U_{79b}, U_{79c}, U_{80b}) or edges (U_{19}).)

Fourteen possible Bravais lattices exist that fill three-dimensional space.

==== G_{2} ====
The exceptional Lie algebra G_{2} is the simplest of five such algebras, with a minimal faithful representation in fourteen dimensions. It is the automorphism group of the octonions $\mathbb {O}$, and holds a compact form homeomorphic to the zero divisors with entries of unit norm in the sedenions, $\mathbb {S}$.

=== Riemann zeta function ===
The floor of the imaginary part of the first non-trivial zero in the Riemann zeta function is $14$, in equivalence with its nearest integer value, from an approximation of $14.1347251417\ldots$

== In religion and mythology ==
=== Christianity ===
There is a fourteen-point silver star marking the traditional spot of Jesus’ birth in the Basilica of the Nativity in Bethlehem. According to the genealogy of Jesus in the Gospel of Matthew, “...there were fourteen generations in all from Abraham to David, fourteen generations from David to the exile to Babylon, and fourteen from the exile to the Messiah” (Matthew 1:17).

=== Islam ===
In Islam, 14 has a special significance because of the Fourteen Infallibles who are especially revered and important in Twelver Shi'ism. They are all considered to be infallible by Twelvers alongside the Prophets of Islam, however these fourteen are said to have a greater significance and closeness to God.

These fourteen include:

1. Prophet Muhammad (SAWA)
2. His daughter, Lady Fatima (SA)
3. Her husband, Imam Ali (AS)
4. His son, Imam Hasan (AS)
5. His brother, Imam Husayn (AS)
6. His son, Imam Ali al-Sajjad (AS)
7. His son, Imam Muhammad al-Baqir (AS)
8. His son, Imam Ja'far al-Sadiq (AS)
9. His son, Imam Musa al-Kazim (AS)
10. His son, Imam Ali al-Rida (AS)
11. His son, Imam Muhammad al-Jawad (AS)
12. His son, Imam Ali al-Hadi (AS)
13. His son, Imam Hasan al-Askari (AS)
14. His son, Imam Muhammad al-Mahdi (AJTFS)

=== Mythology ===
The number 14 was linked to Šumugan and Nergal.

== In other fields ==
There are fourteen days in a fortnight.
