= Augmented hexagonal prism =

54th Johnson solid (11 faces)

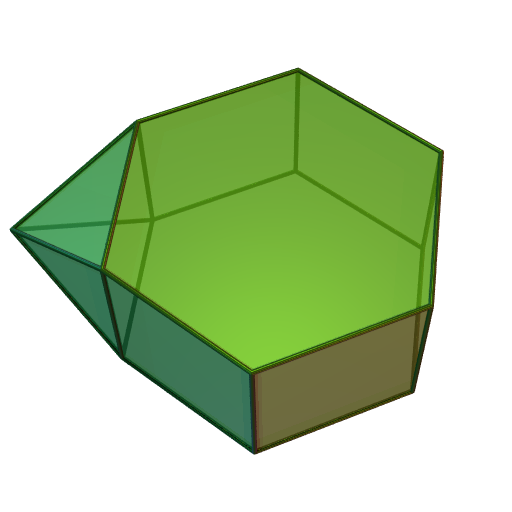
- Type: Johnson; J_{53} – J_{54} – J_{55}
- Faces: 4 triangles 5 squares 2 hexagons
- Edges: 22
- Vertices: 13
- Vertex configuration: 2×4(4^{2}.6); 1(3^{4}); 4(3^{2}.4.6)
- Symmetry group: C_{2v}
- Properties: convex

Net
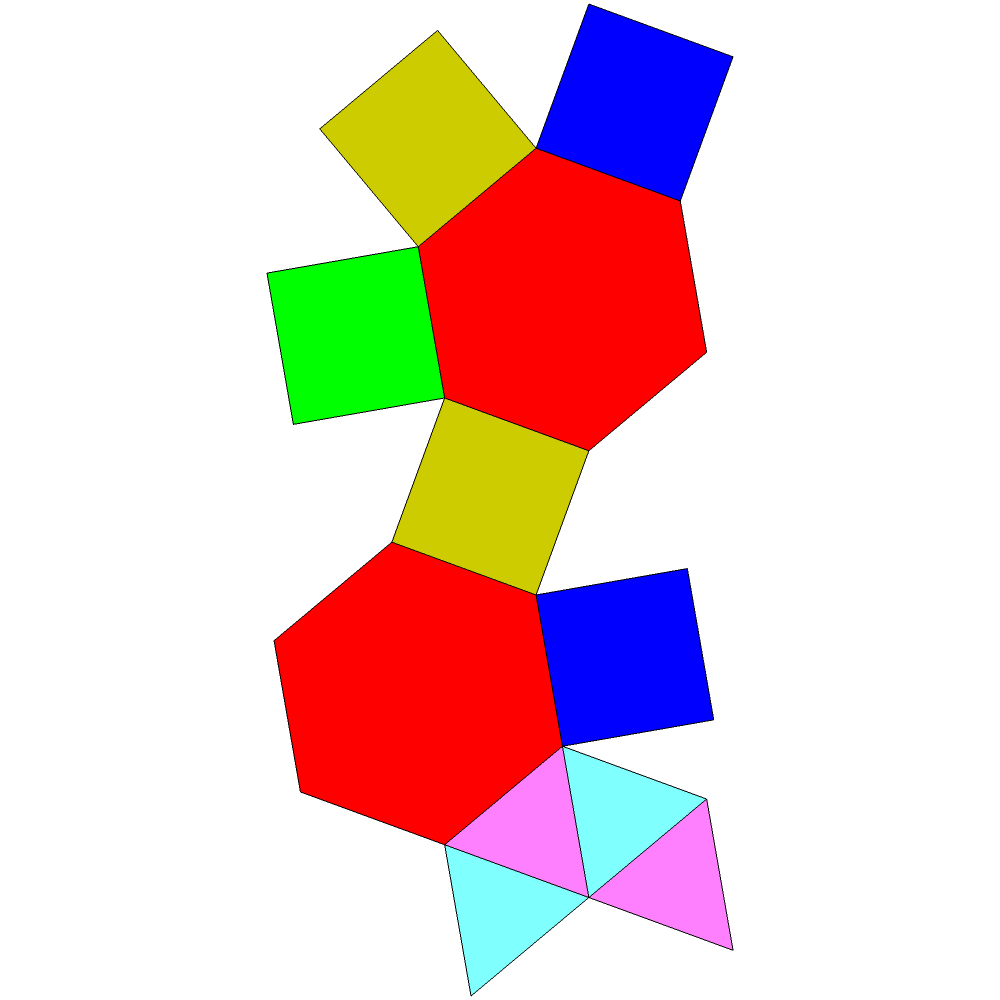

In geometry, the augmented hexagonal prism is one of the Johnson solids (J_{54}). As the name suggests, it can be constructed by augmenting a hexagonal prism by attaching a square pyramid (J_{1}) to one of its equatorial faces. When two or three such pyramids are attached, the result may be a parabiaugmented hexagonal prism (J_{55}), a metabiaugmented hexagonal prism (J_{56}), or a triaugmented hexagonal prism (J_{57}).

3D model of an augmented hexagonal prism

== Construction ==
The augmented hexagonal prism is constructed by attaching one equilateral square pyramid onto the square face of a hexagonal prism, a process known as augmentation. This construction involves the removal of the prism square face and replacing it with the square pyramid, so that there are eleven faces: four equilateral triangles, five squares, and two regular hexagons. A convex polyhedron in which all of the faces are regular is a Johnson solid, and the augmented hexagonal prism is among them, enumerated as $J_{54}$. Relatedly, two or three equilateral square pyramids attaching onto more square faces of the prism give more different Johnson solids; these are the parabiaugmented hexagonal prism $J_{55}$, the metabiaugmented hexagonal prism $J_{56}$, and the triaugmented hexagonal prism $J_{57}$.

== Properties ==
An augmented hexagonal prism with edge length $a$ has surface area
$$\left(5 + 4\sqrt{3}\right)a^2 \approx 11.928a^2,$$
the sum of two hexagons, four equilateral triangles, and five squares area. Its volume
$$\frac{\sqrt{2} + 9\sqrt{3}}{2}a^3 \approx 8.501a^3,$$
can be obtained by slicing into one equilateral square pyramid and one hexagonal prism, and adding their volume up.

It has an axis of symmetry passing through the apex of a square pyramid and the centroid of a prism square face, rotated in a half and full-turn angle. Its dihedral angle can be obtained by calculating the angle of a square pyramid and a hexagonal prism in the following:

- The dihedral angle of an augmented hexagonal prism between two adjacent triangles is the dihedral angle of an equilateral square pyramid, $\arccos \left(-1/3\right) \approx 109.5^\circ$
- The dihedral angle of an augmented hexagonal prism between two adjacent squares is the interior of a regular hexagon, $2\pi/3 = 120^\circ$
- The dihedral angle of an augmented hexagonal prism between square-to-hexagon is the dihedral angle of a hexagonal prism between its base and its lateral face, $\pi/2$
- The dihedral angle of a square pyramid between triangle (its lateral face) and square (its base) is $\arctan \left(\sqrt{2}\right) \approx 54.74^\circ$. Therefore, the dihedral angle of an augmented hexagonal prism between square-to-triangle and between triangle-to-hexagon, on the edge in which the square pyramid and hexagonal prism are attached, are
  $$\begin{align}
\arctan \left(\sqrt{2}\right) + \frac{2\pi}{3} \approx 174.74^\circ, \\
\arctan \left(\sqrt{2}\right) + \frac{\pi}{2} \approx 144.74^\circ.
\end{align}$$.
