= Parallelogon =

Polygon able to tessellate edge-to-edge, without rotation

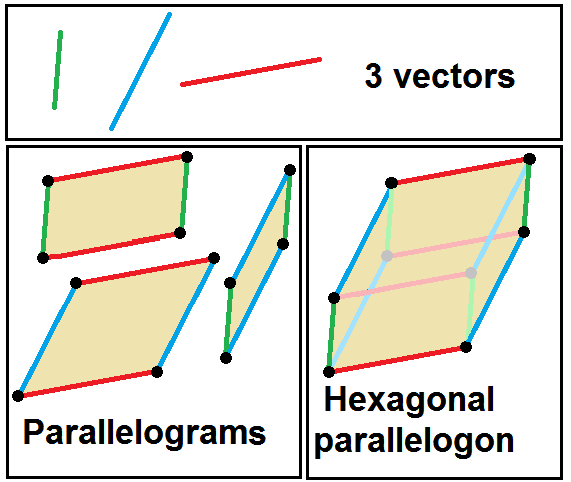
A parallelogon is constructed by two or three pairs of parallel line segments. The vertices and edges on the interior of the hexagon are suppressed.

There are five Bravais lattices in two dimensions, related to the parallelogon tessellations by their five symmetry variations.

In geometry, a parallelogon is a polygon with parallel opposite sides (hence the name) that can tile a plane by translation (rotation is not permitted).

Parallelogons have four or six sides, opposite sides that are equal in length, and 180-degree rotational symmetry around the center. A four-sided parallelogon is a parallelogram.

The three-dimensional analogue of a parallelogon is a parallelohedron. All faces of a parallelohedron are parallelogons.

== Two polygonal types ==
Quadrilateral and hexagonal parallelogons each have varied geometric symmetric forms. They all have central inversion symmetry, order 2. Every convex parallelogon is a zonogon, but hexagonal parallelogons enable the possibility of nonconvex polygons.

Sides	Examples	Name	Symmetry
4		Parallelogram	Z_{2}, order 2
4		Rectangle & rhombus	Dih_{2}, order 4
4		Square	Dih_{4}, order 8
6		Elongated parallelogram	Z_{2}, order 2
6		Elongated rhombus	Dih_{2}, order 4
6		Regular hexagon	Dih_{6}, order 12

== Geometric variations ==
A parallelogram can tile the plane as a distorted square tiling while a hexagonal parallelogon can tile the plane as a distorted regular hexagonal tiling.

Parallelogram tilings
1 length		2 lengths	
Right	Skew	Right	Skew
Square p4m (*442)	Rhombus cmm (2*22)	Rectangle pmm (*2222)	Parallelogram p2 (2222)

Hexagonal parallelogon tilings
1 length	2 lengths	3 lengths
Regular hexagon p6m (*632)	Elongated rhombus cmm (2*22)	Elongated parallelogram p2 (2222)
