= Augmented pentagonal prism =

52nd Johnson solid (10 faces)

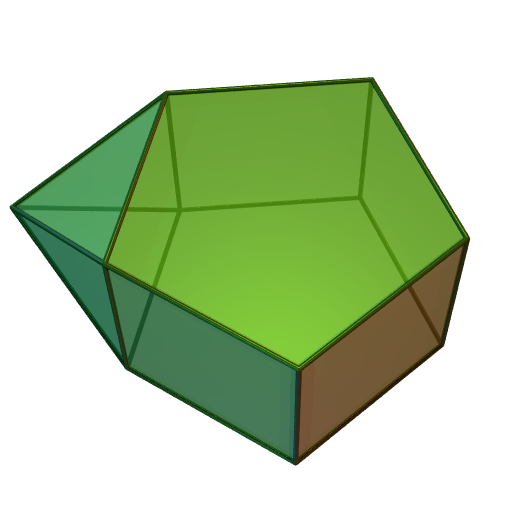
- Type: Johnson; J_{51} – J_{52} – J_{53}
- Faces: 4 triangles 4 squares 2 pentagons
- Edges: 19
- Vertices: 11
- Vertex configuration: 2+4(4^{2}.5); 1(3^{4}); 4(3^{2}.4.5)
- Symmetry group: C_{2v}
- Properties: convex

Net
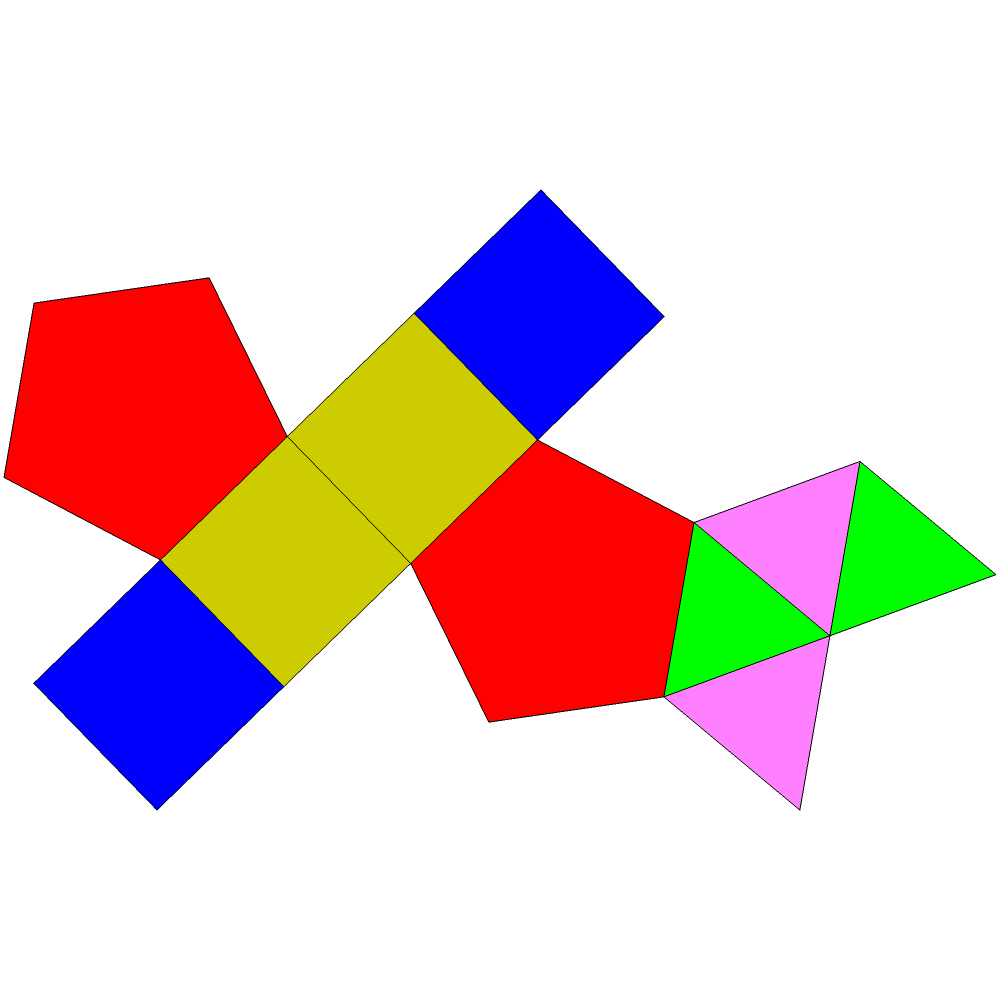

In geometry, the augmented pentagonal prism is a polyhedron that can be constructed by attaching an equilateral square pyramid onto the square face of pentagonal prism. It is an example of Johnson solid.

3D model of an augmented pentagonal prism

== Construction ==
The augmented pentagonal prism can be constructed from a pentagonal prism by attaching an equilateral square pyramid to one of its square faces, a process known as augmentation. This square pyramid covers the square face of the prism, so the resulting polyhedron has four equilateral triangles, four squares, and two regular pentagons as its faces. A convex polyhedron in which all faces are regular is Johnson solid, and the augmented pentagonal prism is among them, enumerated as 52nd Johnson solid $J_{52}$.

== Properties ==
An augmented pentagonal prism with edge length $a$ has a surface area, calculated by adding the area of four equilateral triangles, four squares, and two regular pentagons:
$$\frac{8 + 2\sqrt{3} + \sqrt{5 + 2\sqrt{5}}}{2}a^2 \approx 9.173a^2.$$
Its volume can be obtained by slicing it into a regular pentagonal prism and an equilateral square pyramid, and adding their volume subsequently:
$$\frac{\sqrt{233 + 90\sqrt{5} + 12\sqrt{50 + 20\sqrt{5}}}}{12}a^3 \approx 1.9562a^3.$$

The augmented pentagonal prism has a three-dimensional symmetry group $C_{2\mathrm{v}}$ of order four. It has five dihedral angles (an angle between two polygonal faces), obtained by adding the equilateral square pyramid and the regular pentagonal prism's angle. These angles are as follow:

- an angle between two adjacent triangular faces is that of an equilateral square pyramid between two adjacent triangular faces, $\arccos \left(-\frac{1}{3} \right) \approx 109.5^\circ$,
- an angle between two adjacent square faces is the internal angle of a regular pentagon $\frac{3\pi}{5} = 108^\circ$.
- an angle between a square and a pentagon is that of a regular pentagonal prism between its base and its lateral faces $\frac{\pi}{2} = 90^\circ$.
- an angle between pentagon and triangle is $\arctan \left(\sqrt{2}\right) + \frac{\pi}{2} \approx 144.7^\circ$, for which adding the dihedral angle of an equilateral square pyramid between its base and its lateral face $\arctan \left(\sqrt{2}\right) \approx 54.7^\circ$, and the dihedral angle of a regular pentagonal prism between its base and its lateral face.
- an angle between a square and triangle is $\arctan \left(\sqrt{2}\right) + \frac{3\pi}{5} \approx 162.7^\circ$, for which adding the dihedral angle of an equilateral square pyramid between its base and its lateral face, and the dihedral angle of a regular pentagonal prism between two adjacent squares.
