= Biaugmented pentagonal prism =

53rd Johnson solid (13 faces)

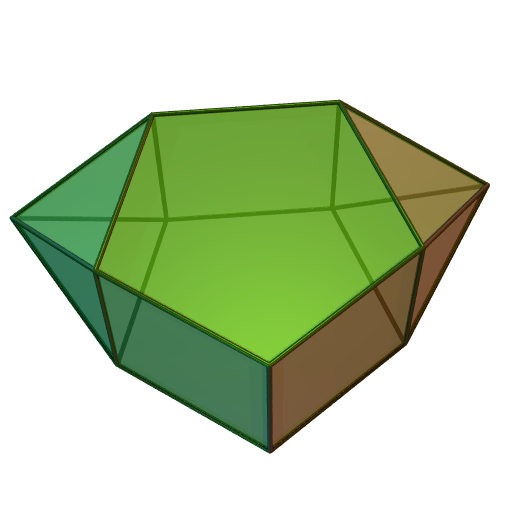
- Type: Johnson; J_{52} – J_{53} – J_{54}
- Faces: 8 equilateral triangles 3 squares 2 pentagons
- Edges: 23
- Vertices: 12
- Vertex configuration: 2(4^{2}.5); 2(3^{4}); 2×4(3^{2}.4.5)
- Symmetry group: C_{2v}
- Properties: convex

Net
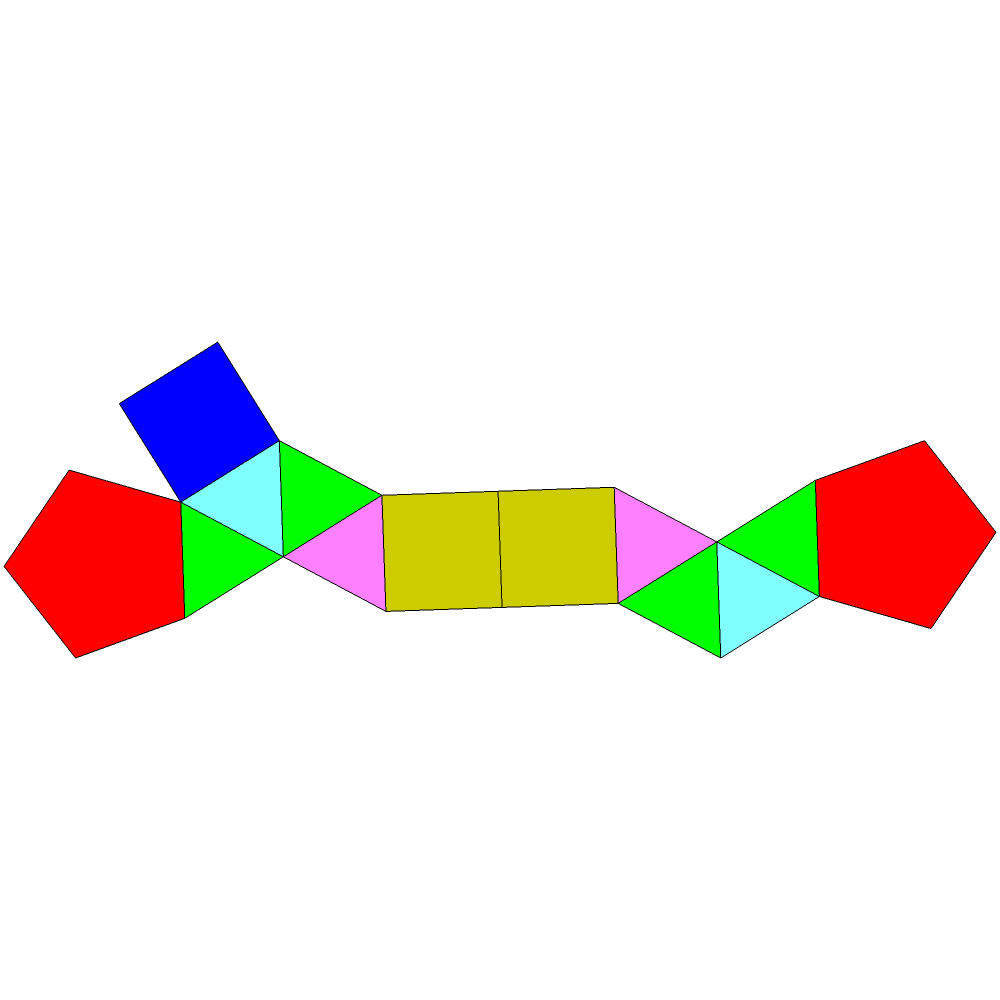

In geometry, the biaugmented pentagonal prism is a polyhedron constructed from a pentagonal prism by attaching two equilateral square pyramids onto each of its square faces. It is an example of a Johnson solid.

3D model of a biaugmented pentagonal prism

== Construction ==
The biaugmented pentagonal prism can be constructed from a pentagonal prism by attaching two equilateral square pyramids to each of its square faces, a process known as augmentation. These square pyramids cover the square face of the prism, so the resulting polyhedron has eight equilateral triangles, three squares, and two regular pentagons as its faces. A convex polyhedron in which all faces are regular is Johnson solid, and the augmented pentagonal prism is among them, enumerated as 53rd Johnson solid $J_{53}$.

== Properties ==
An biaugmented pentagonal prism with edge length $a$ has a surface area, calculated by adding the area of four equilateral triangles, four squares, and two regular pentagons:
$$\frac{6 + 4\sqrt{3} + \sqrt{5 + 2\sqrt{5}}}{2}a^2 \approx 9.9051a^2.$$
Its volume can be obtained by slicing it into a regular pentagonal prism and an equilateral square pyramid, and adding their volume subsequently:
$$\frac{\sqrt{257 + 90\sqrt{5} + 24\sqrt{50 + 20\sqrt{5}}}}{12}a^3 \approx 2.1919a^3.$$

The dihedral angle of an augmented pentagonal prism can be calculated by adding the dihedral angle of an equilateral square pyramid and the regular pentagonal prism:

- the dihedral angle of an augmented pentagonal prism between two adjacent triangular faces is that of an equilateral square pyramid between two adjacent triangular faces, $\arccos \left(-\frac{1}{3} \right) \approx 109.5^\circ$,
- the dihedral angle of an augmented pentagonal prism between two adjacent square faces is the internal angle of a regular pentagon $\frac{3\pi}{5} = 108^\circ$.
- the dihedral angle of an augmented pentagonal prism between square-to-pentagon is that of a regular pentagonal prism between its base and its lateral faces $\frac{\pi}{2} = 90^\circ$.
- the dihedral angle of an augmented pentagonal prism between pentagon-to-triangle is $\arctan \left(\sqrt{2}\right) + \frac{\pi}{2} \approx 144.7^\circ$, for which adding the dihedral angle of an equilateral square pyramid between its base and its lateral face $\arctan \left(\sqrt{2}\right) \approx 54.7^\circ$, and the dihedral angle of a regular pentagonal prism between its base and its lateral face.
- the dihedral angle of an augmented pentagonal prism between square-to-triangle is $\arctan \left(\sqrt{2}\right) + \frac{3\pi}{5} \approx 162.7^\circ$, for which adding the dihedral angle of an equilateral square pyramid between its base and its lateral face, and the dihedral angle of a regular pentagonal prism between two adjacent squares.
