= Square pyramid =

Pyramid with a square base

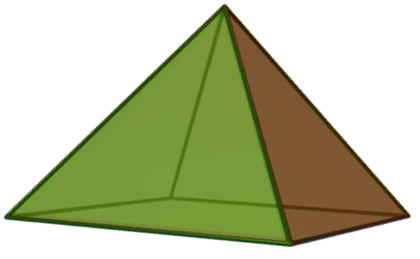
- Type: Pyramid, Johnson; J_{92} – J_{1} – J_{2}
- Faces: 4 triangles 1 square
- Edges: 8
- Vertices: 5
- Vertex configuration: $4 \times (3^2 \times 4) + 1 \times (3^4)$
- Symmetry group: $C_{4\mathrm{v}}$
- Volume: $\frac{1}{3}l^2 h$
- Dihedral angle (degrees): Equilateral square pyramid: triangle-to-triangle: 109.47°; square-to-triangle: 54.74°
- Dual polyhedron: self-dual
- Properties: convex, elementary (equilateral square pyramid)

Net

In geometry, a square pyramid is a pyramid with a square base and four triangles, having a total of five faces. If the apex of the pyramid is directly above the center of the square, it becomes a form of right pyramid with four isosceles triangles. When all of the pyramid's edges are equal in length, its triangles are all equilateral, an example of a Johnson solid.

Square pyramids have appeared throughout the history of architecture, with examples being Egyptian pyramids and many other similar buildings. They also occur in chemistry in square pyramidal molecular structures. Square pyramids are often used in the construction of other polyhedra and as the cell of a four-dimensional polytope called cubic pyramid. Square pyramidal number is a natural number that counts the number of spheres stacked into a square pyramid. Many mathematicians in ancient times discovered the formula for the volume of a square pyramid with different approaches.

== Special cases ==
=== As a right pyramid ===
A square pyramid has five vertices, eight edges, and five faces. One face, called the base of the pyramid, is a square; the four other faces are triangles. Four of the edges make up the square by connecting its four vertices. The other four edges are known as the lateral edges of the pyramid; they meet at the fifth vertex, called the apex. If the pyramid's apex lies on a line erected perpendicularly from the center of the square, the square pyramid becomes a right pyramid, and the four triangular faces are isosceles triangles. Otherwise, the pyramid has two or more non-isosceles triangular faces.

The slant height $s$ of a right square pyramid is defined as the height of one of its isosceles triangles. It can be obtained via the Pythagorean theorem:
$$s = \sqrt{b^2 - \frac{l^2}{4}},$$
where $l$ is the length of the triangle's base, also one of the square's edges, and $b$ is the length of the triangle's legs, which are lateral edges of the pyramid. The height $h$ of a right square pyramid can be similarly obtained, with a substitution of the slant height formula giving:
$$h = \sqrt{s^2 - \frac{l^2}{4}} = \sqrt{b^2 - \frac{l^2}{2}}.$$
A polyhedron's surface area is the sum of the areas of its faces. The surface area $A$ of a right square pyramid can be expressed as $A = 4T + S$, where $T$ and $S$ are the areas of one of its triangles and its base, respectively. The area of a triangle is half of the product of its base and side, with the area of a square being the length of the side squared. This gives the expression:
$$A = 4\left(\frac{1}{2}ls\right) + l^2 = 2ls + l^2.$$
In general, the volume $V$ of a pyramid is equal to one-third of the area of its base multiplied by its height. Expressed in a formula for a square pyramid, this is:
$$V = \frac{1}{3}l^2h.$$

Many mathematicians discovered the formula for calculating the volume of a square pyramid in ancient times. In the Moscow Mathematical Papyrus, Egyptian mathematicians demonstrated knowledge of the formula for calculating the volume of a truncated square pyramid, suggesting that they were also acquainted with the volume of a square pyramid, but it is unknown how the formula was derived. Beyond the discovery of the volume of a square pyramid, the problem of finding the slope and height of a square pyramid can be found in the Rhind Mathematical Papyrus. The Babylonian mathematicians also considered the volume of a frustum, but gave an incorrect formula for it. One Chinese mathematician Liu Hui also discovered the volume by the method of dissecting a rectangular solid into pieces.

Like other right pyramids with a regular polygon as a base, a right square pyramid has pyramidal symmetry, the symmetry of cyclic group $C_{4\mathrm{v}}$: the pyramid is left invariant by rotations of one-, two-, and three-quarters of a full turn around its axis of symmetry, the line connecting the apex to the center of the base; and is also mirror symmetric relative to any perpendicular plane passing through a bisector of the base. It can be represented as the wheel graph $W_4$, meaning its skeleton can be interpreted as a square in which its four vertices connect a vertex in the center called the universal vertex. It is self-dual, meaning its dual polyhedron is the square pyramid itself.

=== As a Johnson solid ===
3D model of a square pyramid as a Johnson solid

If all triangular edges are of equal length, then the four triangles are equilateral, and the pyramid's faces are all regular polygons. The four triangles all meet at the apex, and the square meets two triangles at each of the four base vertices. The vertex configuration of an equilateral square pyramid is therefore $4 \times (3^2 \times 4) + 1 \times (3^4)$.

An equilateral square pyramid has two different dihedral angles (angles that are formed by two adjacent faces). The angles between adjacent equilateral triangular faces are $\arccos (-\frac{1}{3}) \approx 109.47^\circ$, and the angles between the square base and each triangular face are half of that, $\arctan \left(\sqrt{2}\right) \approx 54.74^\circ$.

Since its faces are all regular polygons, the equilateral square pyramid is a Johnson solid, named after American mathematician Norman W. Johnson, who listed the 92 such convex polyhedra that are neither Platonic, prisms, nor antiprisms. In his list, the equilateral square pyramid is enumerated as the first Johnson solid $J_1$. An equilateral square pyramid is an elementary polyhedron: it cannot be separated by a plane to create two small convex polyhedra with regular faces. However, this polyhedron can be used to construct many composite polyhedra (see § Related topics).

Because its edges are all equal in length, the length of the triangle's base is equal to the triangle's legs. To calculate the slant, height, surface area, and volume, one can substitute $b = l$ algebraically to the formulae of a right pyramid:
$$\begin{align}
s = \frac{\sqrt{3}}{2}l \approx 0.866l, &\qquad h = \frac{1}{\sqrt{2}}l \approx 0.707l,\\
A = (1 + \sqrt{3})l^2 \approx 2.732l^2, &\qquad V = \frac{\sqrt{2}}{6}l^3 \approx 0.236l^3.
\end{align}$$

== Applications ==
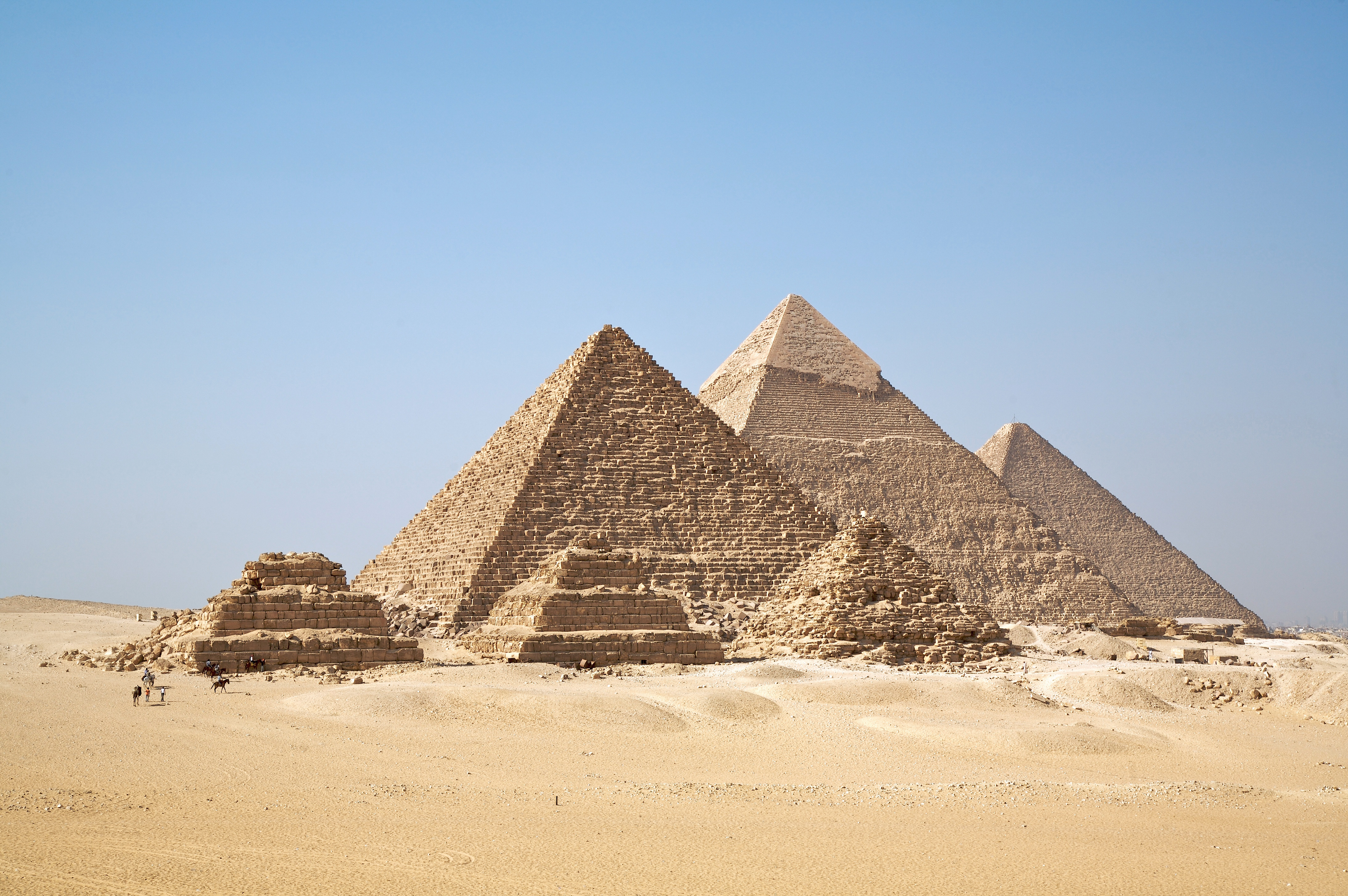
The Egyptian pyramids are examples of square pyramidal buildings in architecture.

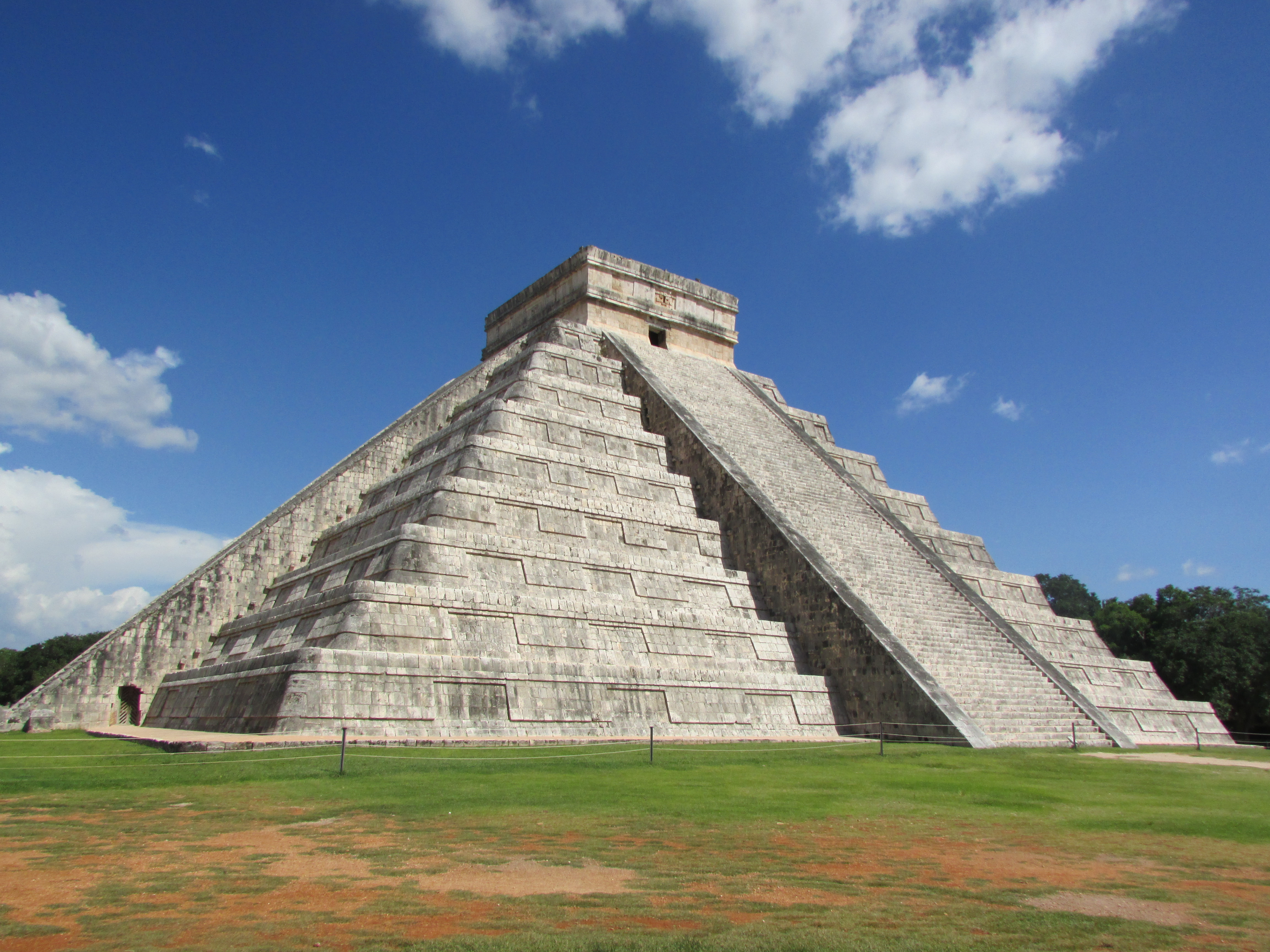
One of the Mesoamerican pyramids, a similar building to the Egyptian, has flat tops and stairs at the faces

In architecture, the pyramids built in ancient Egypt are examples of buildings shaped like square pyramids. Pyramidologists have put forward various suggestions for the design of the Great Pyramid of Giza, including a theory based on the Kepler triangle and the golden ratio. However, modern scholars favor descriptions using integer ratios, as being more consistent with the knowledge of Egyptian mathematics and proportion. The Mesoamerican pyramids are also ancient pyramidal buildings similar to the Egyptian; they differ in having flat tops and stairs ascending their faces. Modern buildings whose designs imitate the Egyptian pyramids include the Louvre Pyramid and the casino hotel Luxor Las Vegas.

In stereochemistry, an atom cluster can have a square pyramidal geometry. A square pyramidal molecule has a main-group element with one active lone pair, which can be described by a model that predicts the geometry of molecules known as VSEPR theory. Examples of molecules with this structure include chlorine pentafluoride, bromine pentafluoride, and iodine pentafluoride.

== Related topics ==
Geometric representation of the square pyramidal number 1 + 4 + 9 + 16 = 30.

A square pyramidal number is a natural number that counts the number of stacked spheres in a square pyramid. If the pyramid has $n$ layers, then it has $1^2 + 2^2 + \dots + n^2 = n(n+1)(2n+1)/6$ spheres. The first few terms of this sequence are:

1, 5, 14, 30, 55, 91, ...

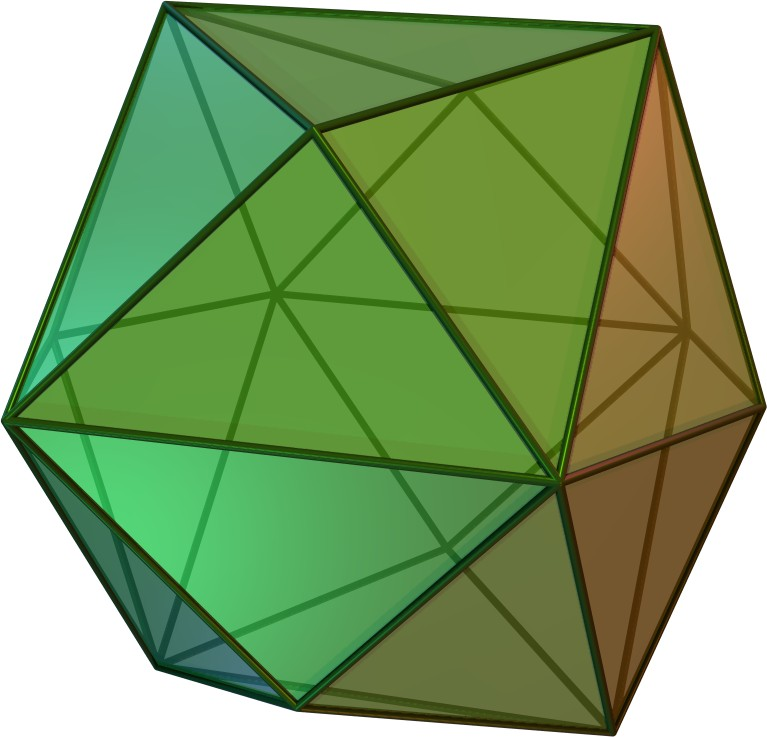
Tetrakis hexahedron, a construction of polyhedra by augmentation involving square pyramids

Cubic pyramid, a four-dimensional polytope with six square pyramids and a cube as its cells

The base of a square pyramid can be attached to a square face of another polyhedron to construct new polyhedra, an example of augmentation. For example, a tetrakis hexahedron can be constructed by attaching the base of an equilateral square pyramid onto each face of a cube. Attaching prisms or antiprisms to pyramids is known as elongation or gyroelongation, respectively. Some of the other Johnson solids can be constructed by either augmenting square pyramids or augmenting other shapes with square pyramids: elongated square pyramid $J_8$, gyroelongated square pyramid $J_{10}$, elongated square bipyramid $J_{15}$, gyroelongated square bipyramid $J_{17}$, augmented triangular prism $J_{49}$, biaugmented triangular prism $J_{50}$, triaugmented triangular prism $J_{51}$, augmented pentagonal prism $J_{52}$, biaugmented pentagonal prism $J_{53}$, augmented hexagonal prism $J_{54}$, parabiaugmented hexagonal prism $J_{55}$, metabiaugmented hexagonal prism $J_{56}$, triaugmented hexagonal prism $J_{57}$, and augmented sphenocorona $J_{87}$.

Square pyramids are the cells of a four-dimensional polytope, the cubic pyramid. This polytope has nine edges, twenty vertices, and eighteen faces (which include twelve triangles and six squares). It has seven cells, consisting of six square pyramids and one cube.

== See also ==
- Regular octahedron or square bipyramid, a polyhedron constructed by attaching two square pyramids base-to-base
