= Triaugmented hexagonal prism =

57th Johnson solid (17 faces)

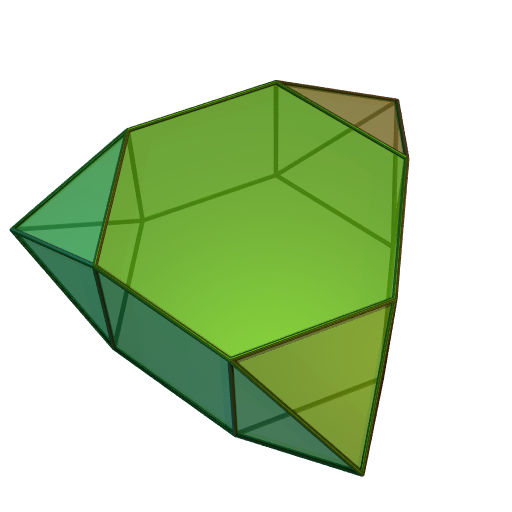
- Type: Johnson; J_{56} – J_{57} – J_{58}
- Faces: 12 triangles 3 squares 2 hexagons
- Edges: 30
- Vertices: 15
- Vertex configuration: 3(3^{4}); 12(3^{2}.4.6)
- Symmetry group: D_{3h}
- Properties: convex

Net
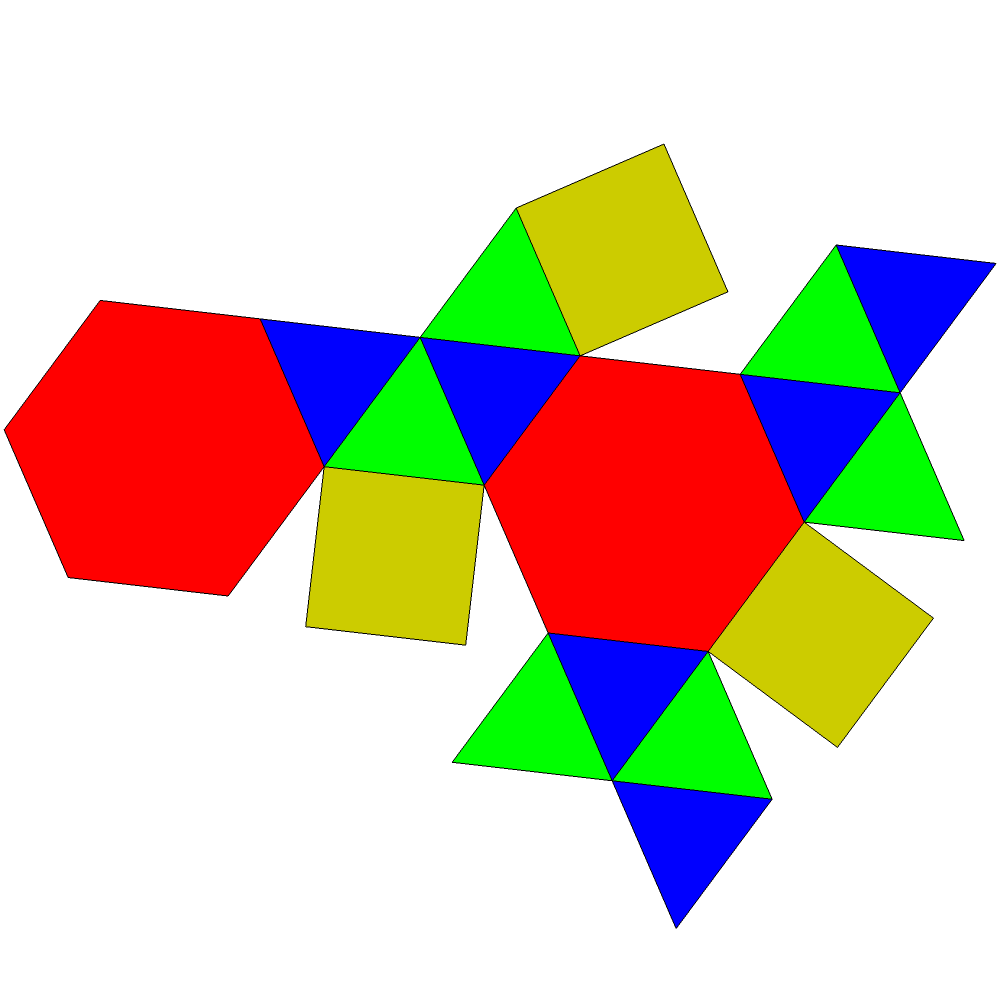

In geometry, the triaugmented hexagonal prism is one of the Johnson solids (J_{57}). As the name suggests, it can be constructed by triply augmenting a hexagonal prism by attaching square pyramids (J_{1}) to three of its nonadjacent equatorial faces.

A Johnson solid is one of 92 strictly convex polyhedra that is composed of regular polygon faces but are not uniform polyhedra (that is, they are not Platonic solids, Archimedean solids, prisms, or antiprisms). They were named by Norman Johnson, who first listed these polyhedra in 1966.

3D model of a triaugmented hexagonal prism

== See also ==
- Hexagonal prism
