= Metabiaugmented hexagonal prism =

56th Johnson solid (14 faces)

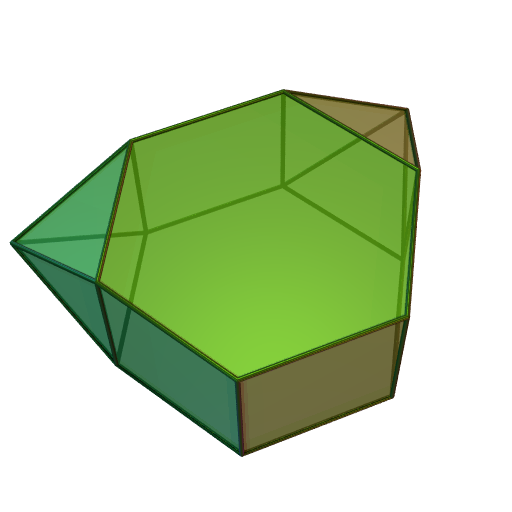
- Type: Johnson; J_{55} – J_{56} – J_{57}
- Faces: 2×2+4 triangles 2+2 squares 2 hexagons
- Edges: 26
- Vertices: 14
- Vertex configuration: 4(4^{2}.6); 2(3^{4}); 2×4(3^{2}.4.6)
- Symmetry group: C_{2v}
- Properties: convex

Net
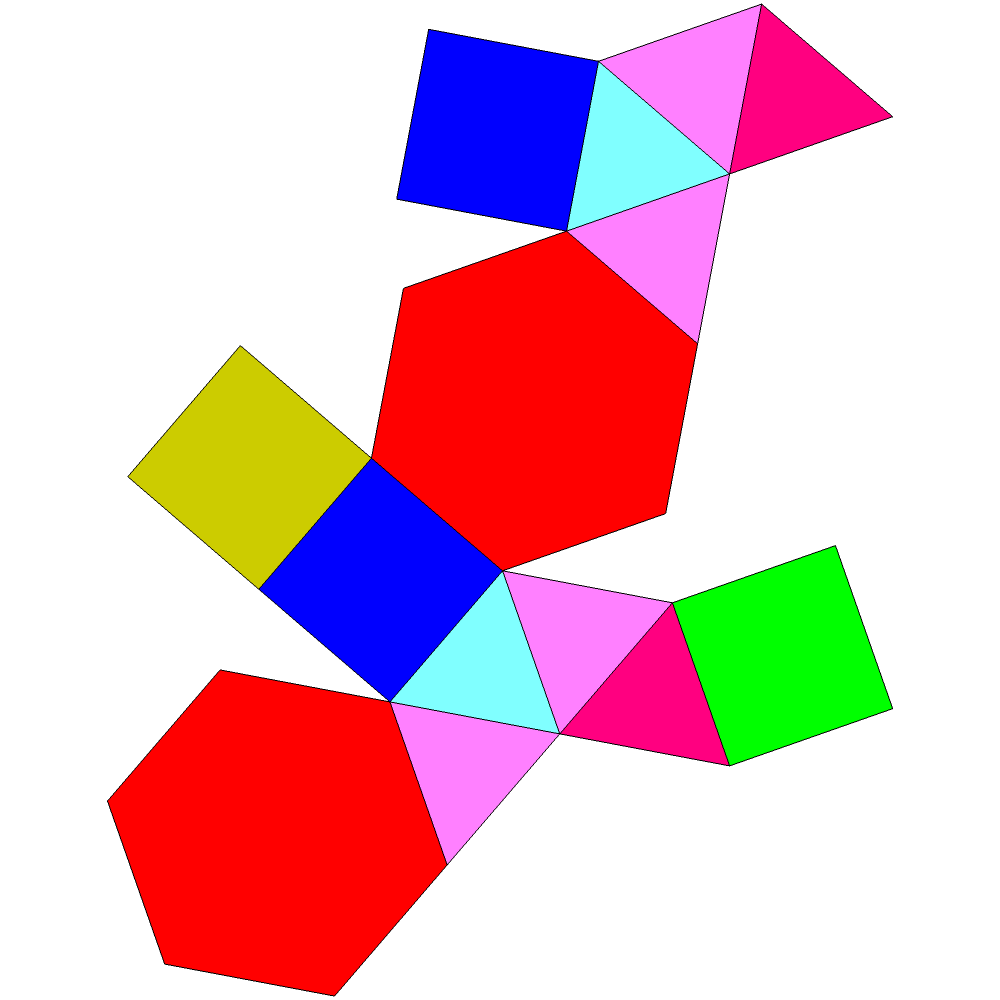

In geometry, the metabiaugmented hexagonal prism is one of the Johnson solids (J_{56}). As the name suggests, it can be constructed by doubly augmenting a hexagonal prism by attaching square pyramids (J_{1}) to two of its nonadjacent, nonparallel equatorial faces. Attaching the pyramids to opposite equatorial faces yields a parabiaugmented hexagonal prism. (The solid obtained by attaching pyramids to adjacent equatorial faces is not convex, and thus not a Johnson solid.)

A Johnson solid is one of 92 strictly convex polyhedra that are composed of regular polygon faces but are not uniform polyhedra (that is, they are not Platonic solids, Archimedean solids, prisms, or antiprisms). They were named by Norman Johnson, who first listed these polyhedra in 1966.

3D model of a metabiaugmented hexagonal prism

== See also ==
- Hexagonal prism
