= B6 polytope =

Orthographic projections in the B_{6} Coxeter plane
6-cube	6-orthoplex	6-demicube

In 6-dimensional geometry, there are 64 uniform polytopes with B_{6} symmetry. There are two regular forms, the 6-orthoplex, and 6-cube with 12 and 64 vertices respectively. The 6-demicube is added with half the symmetry.

They can be visualized as symmetric orthographic projections in Coxeter planes of the B_{6} Coxeter group, and other subgroups.

== Graphs ==
Symmetric orthographic projections of these 64 polytopes can be made in the B_{6}, B_{5}, B_{4}, B_{3}, B_{2}, A_{5}, A_{3}, Coxeter planes. A_{k} has [k+1] symmetry, and B_{k} has [2k] symmetry.

These 64 polytopes are each shown in these 8 symmetry planes, with vertices and edges drawn, and vertices colored by the number of overlapping vertices in each projective position.

#	Coxeter plane graphs							Coxeter-Dynkin diagram Schläfli symbol Names
#	B_{6} [12]	B_{5} / D_{4} / A_{4} [10]	B_{4} [8]	B_{3} / A_{2} [6]	B_{2} [4]	A_{5} [6]	A_{3} [4]	Coxeter-Dynkin diagram Schläfli symbol Names
1								{3,3,3,3,4} 6-orthoplex Hexacontatetrapeton (gee)
2								t_{1}{3,3,3,3,4} Rectified 6-orthoplex Rectified hexacontatetrapeton (rag)
3								t_{2}{3,3,3,3,4} Birectified 6-orthoplex Birectified hexacontatetrapeton (brag)
4								t_{2}{4,3,3,3,3} Birectified 6-cube Birectified hexeract (brox)
5								t_{1}{4,3,3,3,3} Rectified 6-cube Rectified hexeract (rax)
6								{4,3,3,3,3} 6-cube Hexeract (ax)
64								h{4,3,3,3,3} 6-demicube Hemihexeract (hax)
7								t_{0,1}{3,3,3,3,4} Truncated 6-orthoplex Truncated hexacontatetrapeton (tag)
8								t_{0,2}{3,3,3,3,4} Cantellated 6-orthoplex Small rhombated hexacontatetrapeton (srog)
9								t_{1,2}{3,3,3,3,4} Bitruncated 6-orthoplex Bitruncated hexacontatetrapeton (botag)
10								t_{0,3}{3,3,3,3,4} Runcinated 6-orthoplex Small prismated hexacontatetrapeton (spog)
11								t_{1,3}{3,3,3,3,4} Bicantellated 6-orthoplex Small birhombated hexacontatetrapeton (siborg)
12								t_{2,3}{4,3,3,3,3} Tritruncated 6-cube Hexeractihexacontatetrapeton (xog)
13								t_{0,4}{3,3,3,3,4} Stericated 6-orthoplex Small cellated hexacontatetrapeton (scag)
14								t_{1,4}{4,3,3,3,3} Biruncinated 6-cube Small biprismato-hexeractihexacontatetrapeton (sobpoxog)
15								t_{1,3}{4,3,3,3,3} Bicantellated 6-cube Small birhombated hexeract (saborx)
16								t_{1,2}{4,3,3,3,3} Bitruncated 6-cube Bitruncated hexeract (botox)
17								t_{0,5}{4,3,3,3,3} Pentellated 6-cube Small teri-hexeractihexacontatetrapeton (stoxog)
18								t_{0,4}{4,3,3,3,3} Stericated 6-cube Small cellated hexeract (scox)
19								t_{0,3}{4,3,3,3,3} Runcinated 6-cube Small prismated hexeract (spox)
20								t_{0,2}{4,3,3,3,3} Cantellated 6-cube Small rhombated hexeract (srox)
21								t_{0,1}{4,3,3,3,3} Truncated 6-cube Truncated hexeract (tox)
22								t_{0,1,2}{3,3,3,3,4} Cantitruncated 6-orthoplex Great rhombated hexacontatetrapeton (grog)
23								t_{0,1,3}{3,3,3,3,4} Runcitruncated 6-orthoplex Prismatotruncated hexacontatetrapeton (potag)
24								t_{0,2,3}{3,3,3,3,4} Runcicantellated 6-orthoplex Prismatorhombated hexacontatetrapeton (prog)
25								t_{1,2,3}{3,3,3,3,4} Bicantitruncated 6-orthoplex Great birhombated hexacontatetrapeton (gaborg)
26								t_{0,1,4}{3,3,3,3,4} Steritruncated 6-orthoplex Cellitruncated hexacontatetrapeton (catog)
27								t_{0,2,4}{3,3,3,3,4} Stericantellated 6-orthoplex Cellirhombated hexacontatetrapeton (crag)
28								t_{1,2,4}{3,3,3,3,4} Biruncitruncated 6-orthoplex Biprismatotruncated hexacontatetrapeton (boprax)
29								t_{0,3,4}{3,3,3,3,4} Steriruncinated 6-orthoplex Celliprismated hexacontatetrapeton (copog)
30								t_{1,2,4}{4,3,3,3,3} Biruncitruncated 6-cube Biprismatotruncated hexeract (boprag)
31								t_{1,2,3}{4,3,3,3,3} Bicantitruncated 6-cube Great birhombated hexeract (gaborx)
32								t_{0,1,5}{3,3,3,3,4} Pentitruncated 6-orthoplex Teritruncated hexacontatetrapeton (tacox)
33								t_{0,2,5}{3,3,3,3,4} Penticantellated 6-orthoplex Terirhombated hexacontatetrapeton (tapox)
34								t_{0,3,4}{4,3,3,3,3} Steriruncinated 6-cube Celliprismated hexeract (copox)
35								t_{0,2,5}{4,3,3,3,3} Penticantellated 6-cube Terirhombated hexeract (topag)
36								t_{0,2,4}{4,3,3,3,3} Stericantellated 6-cube Cellirhombated hexeract (crax)
37								t_{0,2,3}{4,3,3,3,3} Runcicantellated 6-cube Prismatorhombated hexeract (prox)
38								t_{0,1,5}{4,3,3,3,3} Pentitruncated 6-cube Teritruncated hexeract (tacog)
39								t_{0,1,4}{4,3,3,3,3} Steritruncated 6-cube Cellitruncated hexeract (catax)
40								t_{0,1,3}{4,3,3,3,3} Runcitruncated 6-cube Prismatotruncated hexeract (potax)
41								t_{0,1,2}{4,3,3,3,3} Cantitruncated 6-cube Great rhombated hexeract (grox)
42								t_{0,1,2,3}{3,3,3,3,4} Runcicantitruncated 6-orthoplex Great prismated hexacontatetrapeton (gopog)
43								t_{0,1,2,4}{3,3,3,3,4} Stericantitruncated 6-orthoplex Celligreatorhombated hexacontatetrapeton (cagorg)
44								t_{0,1,3,4}{3,3,3,3,4} Steriruncitruncated 6-orthoplex Celliprismatotruncated hexacontatetrapeton (captog)
45								t_{0,2,3,4}{3,3,3,3,4} Steriruncicantellated 6-orthoplex Celliprismatorhombated hexacontatetrapeton (coprag)
46								t_{1,2,3,4}{4,3,3,3,3} Biruncicantitruncated 6-cube Great biprismato-hexeractihexacontatetrapeton (gobpoxog)
47								t_{0,1,2,5}{3,3,3,3,4} Penticantitruncated 6-orthoplex Terigreatorhombated hexacontatetrapeton (togrig)
48								t_{0,1,3,5}{3,3,3,3,4} Pentiruncitruncated 6-orthoplex Teriprismatotruncated hexacontatetrapeton (tocrax)
49								t_{0,2,3,5}{4,3,3,3,3} Pentiruncicantellated 6-cube Teriprismatorhombi-hexeractihexacontatetrapeton (tiprixog)
50								t_{0,2,3,4}{4,3,3,3,3} Steriruncicantellated 6-cube Celliprismatorhombated hexeract (coprix)
51								t_{0,1,4,5}{4,3,3,3,3} Pentisteritruncated 6-cube Tericelli-hexeractihexacontatetrapeton (tactaxog)
52								t_{0,1,3,5}{4,3,3,3,3} Pentiruncitruncated 6-cube Teriprismatotruncated hexeract (tocrag)
53								t_{0,1,3,4}{4,3,3,3,3} Steriruncitruncated 6-cube Celliprismatotruncated hexeract (captix)
54								t_{0,1,2,5}{4,3,3,3,3} Penticantitruncated 6-cube Terigreatorhombated hexeract (togrix)
55								t_{0,1,2,4}{4,3,3,3,3} Stericantitruncated 6-cube Celligreatorhombated hexeract (cagorx)
56								t_{0,1,2,3}{4,3,3,3,3} Runcicantitruncated 6-cube Great prismated hexeract (gippox)
57								t_{0,1,2,3,4}{3,3,3,3,4} Steriruncicantitruncated 6-orthoplex Great cellated hexacontatetrapeton (gocog)
58								t_{0,1,2,3,5}{3,3,3,3,4} Pentiruncicantitruncated 6-orthoplex Terigreatoprismated hexacontatetrapeton (tagpog)
59								t_{0,1,2,4,5}{3,3,3,3,4} Pentistericantitruncated 6-orthoplex Tericelligreatorhombated hexacontatetrapeton (tecagorg)
60								t_{0,1,2,4,5}{4,3,3,3,3} Pentistericantitruncated 6-cube Tericelligreatorhombated hexeract (tocagrax)
61								t_{0,1,2,3,5}{4,3,3,3,3} Pentiruncicantitruncated 6-cube Terigreatoprismated hexeract (tagpox)
62								t_{0,1,2,3,4}{4,3,3,3,3} Steriruncicantitruncated 6-cube Great cellated hexeract (gocax)
63								t_{0,1,2,3,4,5}{4,3,3,3,3} Omnitruncated 6-cube Great teri-hexeractihexacontatetrapeton (gotaxog)

Fundamental convex regular and uniform polytopes in dimensions 2–10
Family	A_{n}	B_{n}	I_{2}(p) / D_{n}	E_{6} / E_{7} / E_{8} / F_{4} / G_{2}	H_{n}
Regular polygon	Triangle	Square	p-gon	Hexagon	Pentagon
Uniform polyhedron	Tetrahedron	Octahedron • Cube	Demicube		Dodecahedron • Icosahedron
Uniform polychoron	Pentachoron	16-cell • Tesseract	Demitesseract	24-cell	120-cell • 600-cell
Uniform 5-polytope	5-simplex	5-orthoplex • 5-cube	5-demicube		
Uniform 6-polytope	6-simplex	6-orthoplex • 6-cube	6-demicube	1_{22} • 2_{21}	
Uniform 7-polytope	7-simplex	7-orthoplex • 7-cube	7-demicube	1_{32} • 2_{31} • 3_{21}	
Uniform 8-polytope	8-simplex	8-orthoplex • 8-cube	8-demicube	1_{42} • 2_{41} • 4_{21}	
Uniform 9-polytope	9-simplex	9-orthoplex • 9-cube	9-demicube		
Uniform 10-polytope	10-simplex	10-orthoplex • 10-cube	10-demicube		
Uniform n-polytope	n-simplex	n-orthoplex • n-cube	n-demicube	1_{k2} • 2_{k1} • k_{21}	n-pentagonal polytope
Topics: Polytope families • Regular polytope • List of regular polytopes and compounds • Polytope operations
