= Rectified 6-cubes =

Geometrical Shape

6-cube	Rectified 6-cube	Birectified 6-cube
Birectified 6-orthoplex	Rectified 6-orthoplex	6-orthoplex
Orthogonal projections in B_{6} Coxeter plane

In six-dimensional geometry, a rectified 6-cube is a convex uniform 6-polytope, being a rectification of the regular 6-cube.

There are unique 6 degrees of rectifications, the zeroth being the 6-cube, and the 6th and last being the 6-orthoplex. Vertices of the rectified 6-cube are located at the edge-centers of the 6-cube. Vertices of the birectified 6-cube are located in the square face centers of the 6-cube.

== Rectified 6-cube ==
Rectified 6-cube
Type	uniform 6-polytope
Schläfli symbol	t_{1}{4,3^{4}} or r{4,3^{4}} $\left\{\begin{array}{l}4\\3, 3, 3, 3\end{array}\right\}$
Coxeter-Dynkin diagrams	=
5-faces	76
4-faces	444
Cells	1120
Faces	1520
Edges	960
Vertices	192
Vertex figure	5-cell prism
Petrie polygon	Dodecagon
Coxeter groups	B_{6}, [3,3,3,3,4] D_{6}, [3^{3,1,1}]
Properties	convex

=== Alternate names ===
- Rectified hexeract (acronym: rax) (Jonathan Bowers)

=== Construction ===
The rectified 6-cube may be constructed from the 6-cube by truncating its vertices at the midpoints of its edges.

=== Coordinates ===
The Cartesian coordinates of the vertices of the rectified 6-cube with edge length √2 are all permutations of:

$$(0,\ \pm1,\ \pm1,\ \pm1,\ \pm1,\ \pm1)$$

=== Images ===
Orthographic projections
Coxeter plane	B_{6}	B_{5}	B_{4}
Graph			
Dihedral symmetry	[12]	[10]	[8]
Coxeter plane	B_{3}	B_{2}	
Graph			
Dihedral symmetry	[6]	[4]	
Coxeter plane	A_{5}	A_{3}	
Graph			
Dihedral symmetry	[6]	[4]	

== Birectified 6-cube ==
Birectified 6-cube
Type	uniform 6-polytope
Coxeter symbol	0_{311}
Schläfli symbol	t_{2}{4,3^{4}} or 2r{4,3^{4}} $\left\{\begin{array}{l}3, 4\\3, 3, 3\end{array}\right\}$
Coxeter-Dynkin diagrams	= =
5-faces	76
4-faces	636
Cells	2080
Faces	3200
Edges	1920
Vertices	240
Vertex figure	{4}x{3,3} duoprism
Coxeter groups	B_{6}, [3,3,3,3,4] D_{6}, [3^{3,1,1}]
Properties	convex

=== Alternate names ===
- Birectified hexeract (acronym: brox) (Jonathan Bowers)
- Rectified 6-demicube

=== Construction ===
The birectified 6-cube may be constructed from the 6-cube by truncating its vertices at the midpoints of its edges.

=== Coordinates ===
The Cartesian coordinates of the vertices of the rectified 6-cube with edge length √2 are all permutations of:

$$(0,\ 0,\ \pm1,\ \pm1,\ \pm1,\ \pm1)$$

=== Images ===
Orthographic projections
Coxeter plane	B_{6}	B_{5}	B_{4}
Graph			
Dihedral symmetry	[12]	[10]	[8]
Coxeter plane	B_{3}	B_{2}	
Graph			
Dihedral symmetry	[6]	[4]	
Coxeter plane	A_{5}	A_{3}	
Graph			
Dihedral symmetry	[6]	[4]	

== Related polytopes ==
These polytopes are part of a set of 63 uniform 6-polytopes generated from the B_{6} Coxeter plane, including the regular 6-cube and 6-orthoplex.

B6 polytopes
β_{6}	t_{1}β_{6}	t_{2}β_{6}	t_{2}γ_{6}	t_{1}γ_{6}	γ_{6}	t_{0,1}β_{6}	t_{0,2}β_{6}
t_{1,2}β_{6}	t_{0,3}β_{6}	t_{1,3}β_{6}	t_{2,3}γ_{6}	t_{0,4}β_{6}	t_{1,4}γ_{6}	t_{1,3}γ_{6}	t_{1,2}γ_{6}
t_{0,5}γ_{6}	t_{0,4}γ_{6}	t_{0,3}γ_{6}	t_{0,2}γ_{6}	t_{0,1}γ_{6}	t_{0,1,2}β_{6}	t_{0,1,3}β_{6}	t_{0,2,3}β_{6}
t_{1,2,3}β_{6}	t_{0,1,4}β_{6}	t_{0,2,4}β_{6}	t_{1,2,4}β_{6}	t_{0,3,4}β_{6}	t_{1,2,4}γ_{6}	t_{1,2,3}γ_{6}	t_{0,1,5}β_{6}
t_{0,2,5}β_{6}	t_{0,3,4}γ_{6}	t_{0,2,5}γ_{6}	t_{0,2,4}γ_{6}	t_{0,2,3}γ_{6}	t_{0,1,5}γ_{6}	t_{0,1,4}γ_{6}	t_{0,1,3}γ_{6}
t_{0,1,2}γ_{6}	t_{0,1,2,3}β_{6}	t_{0,1,2,4}β_{6}	t_{0,1,3,4}β_{6}	t_{0,2,3,4}β_{6}	t_{1,2,3,4}γ_{6}	t_{0,1,2,5}β_{6}	t_{0,1,3,5}β_{6}
t_{0,2,3,5}γ_{6}	t_{0,2,3,4}γ_{6}	t_{0,1,4,5}γ_{6}	t_{0,1,3,5}γ_{6}	t_{0,1,3,4}γ_{6}	t_{0,1,2,5}γ_{6}	t_{0,1,2,4}γ_{6}	t_{0,1,2,3}γ_{6}
t_{0,1,2,3,4}β_{6}	t_{0,1,2,3,5}β_{6}	t_{0,1,2,4,5}β_{6}	t_{0,1,2,4,5}γ_{6}	t_{0,1,2,3,5}γ_{6}	t_{0,1,2,3,4}γ_{6}	t_{0,1,2,3,4,5}γ_{6}	

== Notes ==
Fundamental convex regular and uniform polytopes in dimensions 2–10
Family	A_{n}	B_{n}	I_{2}(p) / D_{n}	E_{6} / E_{7} / E_{8} / F_{4} / G_{2}	H_{n}
Regular polygon	Triangle	Square	p-gon	Hexagon	Pentagon
Uniform polyhedron	Tetrahedron	Octahedron • Cube	Demicube		Dodecahedron • Icosahedron
Uniform polychoron	Pentachoron	16-cell • Tesseract	Demitesseract	24-cell	120-cell • 600-cell
Uniform 5-polytope	5-simplex	5-orthoplex • 5-cube	5-demicube		
Uniform 6-polytope	6-simplex	6-orthoplex • 6-cube	6-demicube	1_{22} • 2_{21}	
Uniform 7-polytope	7-simplex	7-orthoplex • 7-cube	7-demicube	1_{32} • 2_{31} • 3_{21}	
Uniform 8-polytope	8-simplex	8-orthoplex • 8-cube	8-demicube	1_{42} • 2_{41} • 4_{21}	
Uniform 9-polytope	9-simplex	9-orthoplex • 9-cube	9-demicube		
Uniform 10-polytope	10-simplex	10-orthoplex • 10-cube	10-demicube		
Uniform n-polytope	n-simplex	n-orthoplex • n-cube	n-demicube	1_{k2} • 2_{k1} • k_{21}	n-pentagonal polytope
Topics: Polytope families • Regular polytope • List of regular polytopes and compounds • Polytope operations
