= 5-polytope =

5-dimensional geometric object

Graphs of three regular and three uniform 5-polytopes.
5-simplex (Hexateron)	5-orthoplex, 2_{11} (Pentacross)	5-cube (Penteract)
Expanded 5-simplex	Rectified 5-orthoplex	5-demicube, 1_{21} (Demipenteract)

In geometry, a five-dimensional polytope (or 5-polytope or polyteron) is a polytope in five-dimensional space, bounded by (4-polytope) facets, pairs of which share a polyhedral cell.

== Definition ==
A 5-polytope is a closed five-dimensional figure with vertices, edges, faces, cells, and 4-faces. A vertex is a point where five or more edges meet. An edge is a line segment where four or more faces meet, and a face is a polygon where three or more cells meet. A cell is a polyhedron, and a 4-face is a 4-polytope. Furthermore, the following requirements must be met:

1. Each cell must join exactly two 4-faces.
2. Adjacent 4-faces are not in the same four-dimensional hyperplane.
3. The figure is not a compound of other figures which meet the requirements.

== Characteristics ==
The topology of any given 5-polytope is defined by its Betti numbers and torsion coefficients.

The value of the Euler characteristic used to characterise polyhedra does not generalize usefully to higher dimensions, whatever their underlying topology. This inadequacy of the Euler characteristic to reliably distinguish between different topologies in higher dimensions led to the discovery of the more sophisticated Betti numbers.

Similarly, the notion of orientability of a polyhedron is insufficient to characterise the surface twistings of toroidal polytopes, and this led to the use of torsion coefficients.

== Classification ==
5-polytopes may be classified based on properties like "convexity" and "symmetry".

- A 5-polytope is convex if its boundary (including its cells, faces and edges) does not intersect itself and the line segment joining any two points of the 5-polytope is contained in the 5-polytope or its interior; otherwise, it is non-convex. Self-intersecting 5-polytopes are also known as star polytopes, from analogy with the star-like shapes of the non-convex Kepler-Poinsot polyhedra.
- A uniform 5-polytope has a symmetry group under which all vertices are equivalent, and its facets are uniform 4-polytopes. The faces of a uniform polytope must be regular.
- A semi-regular 5-polytope contains two or more types of regular 4-polytope facets. There is only one such figure, called a demipenteract.
- A regular 5-polytope has all identical regular 4-polytope facets. All regular 5-polytopes are convex.
- A prismatic 5-polytope is constructed by a Cartesian product of two lower-dimensional polytopes. A prismatic 5-polytope is uniform if its factors are uniform. The hypercube is prismatic (product of a square and a cube), but is considered separately because it has symmetries other than those inherited from its factors.
- A 4-space tessellation is the division of four-dimensional Euclidean space into a regular grid of polychoral facets. Strictly speaking, tessellations are not polytopes as they do not bound a "5D" volume, but we include them here for the sake of completeness because they are similar in many ways to polytopes. A uniform 4-space tessellation is one whose vertices are related by a space group and whose facets are uniform 4-polytopes.

== Regular 5-polytopes ==
Regular 5-polytopes can be represented by the Schläfli symbol {p,q,r,s}, with s {p,q,r} polychoral facets around each face.

There are exactly three such convex regular 5-polytopes:

1. {3,3,3,3} – 5-simplex
2. {4,3,3,3} – 5-cube
3. {3,3,3,4} – 5-orthoplex

For the 3 convex regular 5-polytopes and three semiregular 5-polytope, their elements are:

Name	Schläfli symbol(s)	Coxeter diagram(s)	Vertices	Edges	Faces	Cells	4-faces	Symmetry (order)
5-simplex	{3,3,3,3}		6	15	20	15	6	A_{5}, (120)
5-cube	{4,3,3,3}		32	80	80	40	10	BC_{5}, (3820)
5-orthoplex	{3,3,3,4} {3,3,3^{1,1}}		10	40	80	80	32	BC_{5}, (3840); 2×D_{5}

== Uniform 5-polytopes ==
For three of the semiregular 5-polytope, their elements are:

Name	Schläfli symbol(s)	Coxeter diagram(s)	Vertices	Edges	Faces	Cells	4-faces	Symmetry (order)
Expanded 5-simplex	t_{0,4}{3,3,3,3}		30	120	210	180	62	2×A_{5}, (240)
5-demicube	{3,3^{2,1}} h{4,3,3,3}		16	80	160	120	26	D_{5}, (1920) ½BC_{5}
Rectified 5-orthoplex	t_{1}{3,3,3,4} t_{1}{3,3,3^{1,1}}		40	240	400	240	42	BC_{5}, (3840); 2×D_{5}

The expanded 5-simplex is the vertex figure of the uniform 5-simplex honeycomb,. The 5-demicube honeycomb,, vertex figure is a rectified 5-orthoplex and facets are the 5-orthoplex and 5-demicube.

== Pyramids ==
Pyramidal 5-polytopes, or 5-pyramids, can be generated by a 4-polytope base in a 4-space hyperplane connected to a point off the hyperplane. The 5-simplex is the simplest example with a 4-simplex base.

== See also ==
- List of regular polytopes § Dimension 5 and higher

Fundamental convex regular and uniform polytopes in dimensions 2–10
Family	A_{n}	B_{n}	I_{2}(p) / D_{n}	E_{6} / E_{7} / E_{8} / F_{4} / G_{2}	H_{n}
Regular polygon	Triangle	Square	p-gon	Hexagon	Pentagon
Uniform polyhedron	Tetrahedron	Octahedron • Cube	Demicube		Dodecahedron • Icosahedron
Uniform polychoron	Pentachoron	16-cell • Tesseract	Demitesseract	24-cell	120-cell • 600-cell
Uniform 5-polytope	5-simplex	5-orthoplex • 5-cube	5-demicube		
Uniform 6-polytope	6-simplex	6-orthoplex • 6-cube	6-demicube	1_{22} • 2_{21}	
Uniform 7-polytope	7-simplex	7-orthoplex • 7-cube	7-demicube	1_{32} • 2_{31} • 3_{21}	
Uniform 8-polytope	8-simplex	8-orthoplex • 8-cube	8-demicube	1_{42} • 2_{41} • 4_{21}	
Uniform 9-polytope	9-simplex	9-orthoplex • 9-cube	9-demicube		
Uniform 10-polytope	10-simplex	10-orthoplex • 10-cube	10-demicube		
Uniform n-polytope	n-simplex	n-orthoplex • n-cube	n-demicube	1_{k2} • 2_{k1} • k_{21}	n-pentagonal polytope
Topics: Polytope families • Regular polytope • List of regular polytopes and compounds • Polytope operations
