= Table of Lie groups =

Lie groups and their associated Lie algebras

This article gives a table of some common Lie groups and their associated Lie algebras.

The following are noted: the topological properties of the group (dimension; connectedness; compactness; the nature of the fundamental group; and whether or not they are simply connected) as well as on their algebraic properties (abelian; simple; semisimple).

For more examples of Lie groups and other related topics see the list of simple Lie groups; the Bianchi classification of groups of up to three dimensions; see classification of low-dimensional real Lie algebras for up to four dimensions; and the list of Lie group topics.

== Real Lie groups and their algebras ==
Column legend

- Cpt: Is this group G compact? (Yes or No)
- $\pi_0$: Gives the group of components of G. The order of the component group gives the number of connected components. The group is connected if and only if the component group is trivial (denoted by 0).
- $\pi_1$: Gives the fundamental group of G whenever G is connected. The group is simply connected if and only if the fundamental group is trivial (denoted by 0).
- UC: If G is not simply connected, gives the universal cover of G.

Lie group	Description	Cpt	$\pi_0$	$\pi_1$	UC	Remarks	Lie algebra	dim/R
R^{n}	Euclidean space with addition	N	0	0		abelian	R^{n}	n
R^{×}	nonzero real numbers with multiplication	N	Z_{2}	–		abelian	R	1
R^{+}	positive real numbers with multiplication	N	0	0		abelian	R	1
S^{1} = U(1)	the circle group: complex numbers of absolute value 1 with multiplication;	Y	0	Z	R	abelian, isomorphic to SO(2), Spin(2), and R/Z	R	1
Aff(1)	invertible affine transformations from R to R.	N	Z_{2}	–		solvable, semidirect product of R^{+} and R^{×}	$\left\{\left[\begin{smallmatrix}a & b \\ 0 & 1\end{smallmatrix}\right] : a\in \R^*,b \in \mathbb{R}\right\}$	2
H^{×}	non-zero quaternions with multiplication	N	0	0			H	4
S^{3} = Sp(1)	quaternions of absolute value 1 with multiplication; topologically a 3-sphere	Y	0	0		isomorphic to SU(2) and to Spin(3); double cover of SO(3)	Im(H)	3
GL(n,R)	general linear group: invertible n×n real matrices	N	Z_{2}	–			M(n,R)	n^{2}
GL^{+}(n,R)	n×n real matrices with positive determinant	N	0	Z n=2 Z_{2} n>2		GL^{+}(1,R) is isomorphic to R^{+} and is simply connected	M(n,R)	n^{2}
SL(n,R)	special linear group: real matrices with determinant 1	N	0	Z n=2 Z_{2} n>2		SL(1,R) is a single point and therefore compact and simply connected	sl(n,R)	n^{2}−1
SL(2,R)	Orientation-preserving isometries of the Poincaré half-plane, isomorphic to SU(1,1), isomorphic to Sp(2,R).	N	0	Z		The universal cover has no finite-dimensional faithful representations.	sl(2,R)	3
O(n)	orthogonal group: real orthogonal matrices	Y	Z_{2}	–		The symmetry group of the sphere (n=3) or hypersphere.	so(n)	n(n−1)/2
SO(n)	special orthogonal group: real orthogonal matrices with determinant 1	Y	0	Z n=2 Z_{2} n>2	Spin(n) n>2	SO(1) is a single point and SO(2) is isomorphic to the circle group, SO(3) is the rotation group of the sphere.	so(n)	n(n−1)/2
SE(n)	special euclidean group: group of rigid body motions in n-dimensional space.	N	0				se(n)	n + n(n−1)/2
Spin(n)	spin group: double cover of SO(n)	Y	0 n>1	0 n>2		Spin(1) is isomorphic to Z_{2} and not connected; Spin(2) is isomorphic to the circle group and not simply connected	so(n)	n(n−1)/2
Sp(2n,R)	symplectic group: real symplectic matrices	N	0	Z			sp(2n,R)	n(2n+1)
Sp(n)	compact symplectic group: quaternionic n×n unitary matrices	Y	0	0			sp(n)	n(2n+1)
Mp(2n,R)	metaplectic group: double cover of real symplectic group Sp(2n,R)	Y	0	Z		Mp(2,R) is a Lie group that is not algebraic	sp(2n,R)	n(2n+1)
U(n)	unitary group: complex n×n unitary matrices	Y	0	Z	R×SU(n)	For n=1: isomorphic to S^{1}. Note: this is not a complex Lie group/algebra	u(n)	n^{2}
SU(n)	special unitary group: complex n×n unitary matrices with determinant 1	Y	0	0		Note: this is not a complex Lie group/algebra	su(n)	n^{2}−1

== Real Lie algebras ==
Lie algebra	Description	Simple?	Semi-simple?	Remarks	dim/R
R	the real numbers, the Lie bracket is zero				1
R^{n}	the Lie bracket is zero				n
R^{3}	the Lie bracket is the cross product	Yes	Yes		3
H	quaternions, with Lie bracket the commutator				4
Im(H)	quaternions with zero real part, with Lie bracket the commutator; isomorphic to real 3-vectors, with Lie bracket the cross product; also isomorphic to su(2) and to so(3,R)	Yes	Yes		3
M(n,R)	n×n matrices, with Lie bracket the commutator				n^{2}
sl(n,R)	square matrices with trace 0, with Lie bracket the commutator	Yes	Yes		n^{2}−1
so(n)	skew-symmetric square real matrices, with Lie bracket the commutator.	Yes, except n=4	Yes	Exception: so(4) is semi-simple, but not simple.	n(n−1)/2
sp(2n,R)	real matrices that satisfy JA + A^{T}J = 0 where J is the standard skew-symmetric matrix	Yes	Yes		n(2n+1)
sp(n)	square quaternionic matrices A satisfying A = −A^{∗}, with Lie bracket the commutator	Yes	Yes		n(2n+1)
u(n)	square complex matrices A satisfying A = −A^{∗}, with Lie bracket the commutator			Note: this is not a complex Lie algebra	n^{2}
su(n) n≥2	square complex matrices A with trace 0 satisfying A = −A^{∗}, with Lie bracket the commutator	Yes	Yes	Note: this is not a complex Lie algebra	n^{2}−1

== Complex Lie groups and their algebras ==
Note that a "complex Lie group" is defined as a complex analytic manifold that is also a group whose multiplication and inversion are each given by a holomorphic map. The dimensions in the table below are dimensions over C. Note that every complex Lie group/algebra can also be viewed as a real Lie group/algebra of twice the dimension.

Lie group	Description	Cpt	$\pi_0$	$\pi_1$	UC	Remarks	Lie algebra	dim/C
C^{n}	group operation is addition	N	0	0		abelian	C^{n}	n
C^{×}	nonzero complex numbers with multiplication	N	0	Z		abelian	C	1
GL(n,C)	general linear group: invertible n×n complex matrices	N	0	Z		For n=1: isomorphic to C^{×}	M(n,C)	n^{2}
SL(n,C)	special linear group: complex matrices with determinant 1	N	0	0		for n=1 this is a single point and thus compact.	sl(n,C)	n^{2}−1
SL(2,C)	Special case of SL(n,C) for n=2	N	0	0		Isomorphic to Spin(3,C), isomorphic to Sp(2,C)	sl(2,C)	3
PSL(2,C)	Projective special linear group	N	0	Z_{2}	SL(2,C)	Isomorphic to the Möbius group, isomorphic to the restricted Lorentz group SO^{+}(3,1,R), isomorphic to SO(3,C).	sl(2,C)	3
O(n,C)	orthogonal group: complex orthogonal matrices	N	Z_{2}	–		finite for n=1	so(n,C)	n(n−1)/2
SO(n,C)	special orthogonal group: complex orthogonal matrices with determinant 1	N	0	Z n=2 Z_{2} n>2		SO(2,C) is abelian and isomorphic to C^{×}; nonabelian for n>2. SO(1,C) is a single point and thus compact and simply connected	so(n,C)	n(n−1)/2
Sp(2n,C)	symplectic group: complex symplectic matrices	N	0	0			sp(2n,C)	n(2n+1)

== Complex Lie algebras ==
The dimensions given are dimensions over C. Note that every complex Lie algebra can also be viewed as a real Lie algebra of twice the dimension.

Lie algebra	Description	Simple?	Semi-simple?	Remarks	dim/C
C	the complex numbers				1
C^{n}	the Lie bracket is zero				n
M(n,C)	n×n matrices with Lie bracket the commutator				n^{2}
sl(n,C)	square matrices with trace 0 with Lie bracket the commutator	Yes	Yes		n^{2}−1
sl(2,C)	Special case of sl(n,C) with n=2	Yes	Yes	isomorphic to su(2) $\otimes$ C	3
so(n,C)	skew-symmetric square complex matrices with Lie bracket the commutator	Yes, except n=4	Yes	Exception: so(4,C) is semi-simple, but not simple.	n(n−1)/2
sp(2n,C)	complex matrices that satisfy JA + A^{T}J = 0 where J is the standard skew-symmetric matrix	Yes	Yes		n(2n+1)

The Lie algebra of affine transformations of dimension two, in fact, exist for any field. An instance has already been listed in the first table for real Lie algebras.

== See also ==
- Classification of low-dimensional real Lie algebras
- Simple Lie group#Full classification
