= Rectified 6-orthoplexes =

6-orthoplex	Rectified 6-orthoplex	Birectified 6-orthoplex
Birectified 6-cube	Rectified 6-cube	6-cube
Orthogonal projections in B_{6} Coxeter plane

In six-dimensional geometry, a rectified 6-orthoplex is a convex uniform 6-polytope, being a rectification of the regular 6-orthoplex.

There are unique 6 degrees of rectifications, the zeroth being the 6-orthoplex, and the 6th and last being the 6-cube. Vertices of the rectified 6-orthoplex are located at the edge-centers of the 6-orthoplex. Vertices of the birectified 6-orthoplex are located in the triangular face centers of the 6-orthoplex.

== Rectified 6-orthoplex ==
Rectified hexacross
Type	uniform 6-polytope
Schläfli symbols	t_{1}{3^{4},4} or r{3^{4},4} $\left\{\begin{array}{l}3, 3, 3, 4\\3\end{array}\right\}$ r{3,3,3,3^{1,1}}
Coxeter-Dynkin diagrams	= =
5-faces	76 total: 64 rectified 5-simplex 12 5-orthoplex
4-faces	576 total: 192 rectified 5-cell 384 5-cell
Cells	1200 total: 240 octahedron 960 tetrahedron
Faces	1120 total: 160 and 960 triangles
Edges	480
Vertices	60
Vertex figure	16-cell prism
Petrie polygon	Dodecagon
Coxeter groups	B_{6}, [3,3,3,3,4] D_{6}, [3^{3,1,1}]
Properties	convex

The rectified 6-orthoplex is the vertex figure for the demihexeractic honeycomb.

or

=== Alternate names ===
- Rectified hexacross
- Rectified hexacontatetrapeton (acronym: rag) (Jonathan Bowers)

=== Construction ===
There are two Coxeter groups associated with the rectified hexacross, one with the C_{6} or [4,3,3,3,3] Coxeter group, and a lower symmetry with two copies of pentacross facets, alternating, with the D_{6} or [3^{3,1,1}] Coxeter group.

=== Cartesian coordinates ===
Cartesian coordinates for the vertices of a rectified hexacross, centered at the origin, edge length $\sqrt{2}\$ are all permutations of:

(±1,±1,0,0,0,0)

=== Images ===
Orthographic projections
Coxeter plane	B_{6}	B_{5}	B_{4}
Graph			
Dihedral symmetry	[12]	[10]	[8]
Coxeter plane	B_{3}	B_{2}	
Graph			
Dihedral symmetry	[6]	[4]	
Coxeter plane	A_{5}	A_{3}	
Graph			
Dihedral symmetry	[6]	[4]	

=== Root vectors ===
The 60 vertices represent the root vectors of the simple Lie group D_{6}. The vertices can be seen in 3 hyperplanes, with the 15 vertices rectified 5-simplices cells on opposite sides, and 30 vertices of an expanded 5-simplex passing through the center. When combined with the 12 vertices of the 6-orthoplex, these vertices represent the 72 root vectors of the B_{6} and C_{6} simple Lie groups.

The 60 roots of D_{6} can be geometrically folded into H_{3} (Icosahedral symmetry), as to, creating 2 copies of 30-vertex icosidodecahedra, with the Golden ratio between their radii:

Rectified 6-orthoplex		2 icosidodecahedra
3D (H3 projection)	A_{4}/B_{5}/D_{6} Coxeter plane	H_{2} Coxeter plane

== Birectified 6-orthoplex ==
Birectified 6-orthoplex
Type	uniform 6-polytope
Schläfli symbols	t_{2}{3^{4},4} or 2r{3^{4},4} $\left\{\begin{array}{l}3, 3, 4\\3, 3\end{array}\right\}$ t_{2}{3,3,3,3^{1,1}}
Coxeter-Dynkin diagrams	= =
5-faces	76
4-faces	636
Cells	2160
Faces	2880
Edges	1440
Vertices	160
Vertex figure	{3}×{3,4} duoprism
Petrie polygon	Dodecagon
Coxeter groups	B_{6}, [3,3,3,3,4] D_{6}, [3^{3,1,1}]
Properties	convex

The birectified 6-orthoplex can tessellation space in the trirectified 6-cubic honeycomb.

=== Alternate names ===
- Birectified hexacross
- Birectified hexacontatetrapeton (acronym: brag) (Jonathan Bowers)

=== Cartesian coordinates ===
Cartesian coordinates for the vertices of a rectified hexacross, centered at the origin, edge length $\sqrt{2}\$ are all permutations of:

(±1,±1,±1,0,0,0)

=== Images ===
Orthographic projections
Coxeter plane	B_{6}	B_{5}	B_{4}
Graph			
Dihedral symmetry	[12]	[10]	[8]
Coxeter plane	B_{3}	B_{2}	
Graph			
Dihedral symmetry	[6]	[4]	
Coxeter plane	A_{5}	A_{3}	
Graph			
Dihedral symmetry	[6]	[4]	

It can also be projected into 3D-dimensions as →, a dodecahedron envelope.

== Related polytopes ==
These polytopes are in a family of 63 uniform 6-polytopes generated from the B_{6} Coxeter plane, including the regular 6-cube and 6-orthoplex.

B6 polytopes
β_{6}	t_{1}β_{6}	t_{2}β_{6}	t_{2}γ_{6}	t_{1}γ_{6}	γ_{6}	t_{0,1}β_{6}	t_{0,2}β_{6}
t_{1,2}β_{6}	t_{0,3}β_{6}	t_{1,3}β_{6}	t_{2,3}γ_{6}	t_{0,4}β_{6}	t_{1,4}γ_{6}	t_{1,3}γ_{6}	t_{1,2}γ_{6}
t_{0,5}γ_{6}	t_{0,4}γ_{6}	t_{0,3}γ_{6}	t_{0,2}γ_{6}	t_{0,1}γ_{6}	t_{0,1,2}β_{6}	t_{0,1,3}β_{6}	t_{0,2,3}β_{6}
t_{1,2,3}β_{6}	t_{0,1,4}β_{6}	t_{0,2,4}β_{6}	t_{1,2,4}β_{6}	t_{0,3,4}β_{6}	t_{1,2,4}γ_{6}	t_{1,2,3}γ_{6}	t_{0,1,5}β_{6}
t_{0,2,5}β_{6}	t_{0,3,4}γ_{6}	t_{0,2,5}γ_{6}	t_{0,2,4}γ_{6}	t_{0,2,3}γ_{6}	t_{0,1,5}γ_{6}	t_{0,1,4}γ_{6}	t_{0,1,3}γ_{6}
t_{0,1,2}γ_{6}	t_{0,1,2,3}β_{6}	t_{0,1,2,4}β_{6}	t_{0,1,3,4}β_{6}	t_{0,2,3,4}β_{6}	t_{1,2,3,4}γ_{6}	t_{0,1,2,5}β_{6}	t_{0,1,3,5}β_{6}
t_{0,2,3,5}γ_{6}	t_{0,2,3,4}γ_{6}	t_{0,1,4,5}γ_{6}	t_{0,1,3,5}γ_{6}	t_{0,1,3,4}γ_{6}	t_{0,1,2,5}γ_{6}	t_{0,1,2,4}γ_{6}	t_{0,1,2,3}γ_{6}
t_{0,1,2,3,4}β_{6}	t_{0,1,2,3,5}β_{6}	t_{0,1,2,4,5}β_{6}	t_{0,1,2,4,5}γ_{6}	t_{0,1,2,3,5}γ_{6}	t_{0,1,2,3,4}γ_{6}	t_{0,1,2,3,4,5}γ_{6}	

== Notes ==
Fundamental convex regular and uniform polytopes in dimensions 2–10
Family	A_{n}	B_{n}	I_{2}(p) / D_{n}	E_{6} / E_{7} / E_{8} / F_{4} / G_{2}	H_{n}
Regular polygon	Triangle	Square	p-gon	Hexagon	Pentagon
Uniform polyhedron	Tetrahedron	Octahedron • Cube	Demicube		Dodecahedron • Icosahedron
Uniform polychoron	Pentachoron	16-cell • Tesseract	Demitesseract	24-cell	120-cell • 600-cell
Uniform 5-polytope	5-simplex	5-orthoplex • 5-cube	5-demicube		
Uniform 6-polytope	6-simplex	6-orthoplex • 6-cube	6-demicube	1_{22} • 2_{21}	
Uniform 7-polytope	7-simplex	7-orthoplex • 7-cube	7-demicube	1_{32} • 2_{31} • 3_{21}	
Uniform 8-polytope	8-simplex	8-orthoplex • 8-cube	8-demicube	1_{42} • 2_{41} • 4_{21}	
Uniform 9-polytope	9-simplex	9-orthoplex • 9-cube	9-demicube		
Uniform 10-polytope	10-simplex	10-orthoplex • 10-cube	10-demicube		
Uniform n-polytope	n-simplex	n-orthoplex • n-cube	n-demicube	1_{k2} • 2_{k1} • k_{21}	n-pentagonal polytope
Topics: Polytope families • Regular polytope • List of regular polytopes and compounds • Polytope operations
