= Classification of low-dimensional real Lie algebras =

This mathematics-related list provides Mubarakzyanov's classification of low-dimensional real Lie algebras, published in Russian in 1963. It complements the article on Lie algebra in the area of abstract algebra.

An English version and review of this classification was published by Popovych et al. in 2003.

== Mubarakzyanov's Classification ==
Let ${\mathfrak g}_n$ be $n$-dimensional Lie algebra over the field of real numbers with generators $e_1, \dots, e_n$, $n \leq 4$. For each algebra ${\mathfrak g}$ we adduce only non-zero commutators between basis elements.

=== One-dimensional ===
- ${\mathfrak g}_1$, abelian.

=== Two-dimensional ===
- $2{\mathfrak g}_1$, abelian $\mathbb{R}^2$;
- ${\mathfrak g}_{2.1}$, solvable
  $$\mathfrak{aff}(1)=\left\{\begin{pmatrix} a&b \\ 0&0 \end{pmatrix}\,:\,a,b\in\mathbb{R}\right\}$$,

$$[e_1, e_2] = e_1.$$

=== Three-dimensional ===
- $3{\mathfrak g}_1$, abelian, Bianchi I;
- ${\mathfrak g}_{2.1}\oplus {\mathfrak g}_1$, decomposable solvable, Bianchi III;
- ${\mathfrak g}_{3.1}$, Heisenberg–Weyl algebra, nilpotent, Bianchi II,

$$[e_2, e_3] = e_1;$$

- ${\mathfrak g}_{3.2}$, solvable, Bianchi IV,

$$[e_1, e_3] = e_1, \quad [e_2, e_3] = e_1 + e_2;$$

- ${\mathfrak g}_{3.3}$, solvable, Bianchi V,

$$[e_1, e_3] = e_1, \quad [e_2, e_3] = e_2;$$

- ${\mathfrak g}_{3.4}$, solvable, Bianchi VI, Poincaré algebra $\mathfrak{p}(1,1)$ when $\alpha = -1$,

$$[e_1, e_3] = e_1, \quad [e_2, e_3] = \alpha e_2, \quad -1 \leq \alpha < 1, \quad \alpha \neq 0;$$

- ${\mathfrak g}_{3.5}$, solvable, Bianchi VII,

$$[e_1, e_3] = \beta e_1 - e_2, \quad [e_2, e_3] = e_1 + \beta e_2, \quad  \beta \geq 0;$$

- ${\mathfrak g}_{3.6}$, simple, Bianchi VIII, $\mathfrak{sl}(2, \mathbb R ),$

$$[e_1, e_2] = e_1, \quad [e_2, e_3] = e_3, \quad  [e_1, e_3] = 2 e_2;$$

- ${\mathfrak g}_{3.7}$, simple, Bianchi IX, $\mathfrak{so}(3),$

$$[e_2, e_3] = e_1, \quad [e_3, e_1] = e_2, \quad  [e_1, e_2] = e_3.$$

Algebra ${\mathfrak g}_{3.3}$ can be considered as an extreme case of ${\mathfrak g}_{3.5}$, when $\beta \rightarrow \infty$, forming contraction of Lie algebra.

Over the field ${\mathbb C}$ algebras ${\mathfrak g}_{3.5}$, ${\mathfrak g}_{3.7}$ are isomorphic to ${\mathfrak g}_{3.4}$ and ${\mathfrak g}_{3.6}$, respectively.

=== Four-dimensional ===
- $4{\mathfrak g}_1$, abelian;
- ${\mathfrak g}_{2.1} \oplus 2{\mathfrak g}_1$, decomposable solvable,

$$[e_1, e_2] = e_1;$$

- $2{\mathfrak g}_{2.1}$, decomposable solvable,

$$[e_1, e_2] = e_1 \quad [e_3, e_4] = e_3;$$

- ${\mathfrak g}_{3.1} \oplus {\mathfrak g}_1$, decomposable nilpotent,

$$[e_2, e_3] = e_1;$$

- ${\mathfrak g}_{3.2} \oplus {\mathfrak g}_1$, decomposable solvable,

$$[e_1, e_3] = e_1, \quad [e_2, e_3] = e_1 + e_2;$$

- ${\mathfrak g}_{3.3} \oplus {\mathfrak g}_1$, decomposable solvable,

$$[e_1, e_3] = e_1, \quad [e_2, e_3] = e_2;$$

- ${\mathfrak g}_{3.4} \oplus {\mathfrak g}_1$, decomposable solvable,

$$[e_1, e_3] = e_1, \quad [e_2, e_3] = \alpha e_2, \quad -1 \leq \alpha < 1, \quad \alpha \neq 0;$$

- ${\mathfrak g}_{3.5} \oplus {\mathfrak g}_1$, decomposable solvable,

$$[e_1, e_3] = \beta e_1 - e_2 \quad [e_2, e_3] = e_1 + \beta e_2, \quad \beta \geq 0;$$

- ${\mathfrak g}_{3.6} \oplus {\mathfrak g}_1$, unsolvable,

$$[e_1, e_2] = e_1, \quad [e_2, e_3] = e_3, \quad [e_1, e_3] = 2 e_2;$$

- ${\mathfrak g}_{3.7} \oplus {\mathfrak g}_1$, unsolvable,

$$[e_1, e_2] = e_3, \quad [e_2, e_3] = e_1, \quad [e_3, e_1] = e_2;$$

- ${\mathfrak g}_{4.1}$, indecomposable nilpotent,

$$[e_2, e_4] = e_1, \quad [e_3, e_4] = e_2;$$

- ${\mathfrak g}_{4.2}$, indecomposable solvable,

$$[e_1, e_4] = \beta e_1, \quad [e_2, e_4] = e_2, \quad [e_3, e_4] = e_2 + e_3, \quad \beta \neq 0;$$

- ${\mathfrak g}_{4.3}$, indecomposable solvable,

$$[e_1, e_4] = e_1, \quad [e_3, e_4] = e_2;$$

- ${\mathfrak g}_{4.4}$, indecomposable solvable,

$$[e_1, e_4] = e_1, \quad [e_2, e_4] = e_1 + e_2, \quad [e_3, e_4] = e_2+e_3;$$

- ${\mathfrak g}_{4.5}$, indecomposable solvable,

$$[e_1, e_4] = \alpha e_1, \quad [e_2, e_4] = \beta e_2, \quad [e_3, e_4] = \gamma e_3, \quad \alpha \beta \gamma \neq 0;$$

- ${\mathfrak g}_{4.6}$, indecomposable solvable,

$$[e_1, e_4] = \alpha e_1, \quad [e_2, e_4] = \beta e_2 - e_3, \quad [e_3, e_4] = e_2 + \beta e_3, \quad \alpha > 0;$$

- ${\mathfrak g}_{4.7}$, indecomposable solvable,

$$[e_2, e_3] = e_1, \quad [e_1, e_4] = 2 e_1, \quad [e_2, e_4] = e_2, \quad [e_3, e_4] = e_2 + e_3;$$

- ${\mathfrak g}_{4.8}$, indecomposable solvable,

$$[e_2, e_3] = e_1, \quad [e_1, e_4] = (1 + \beta)e_1, \quad [e_2, e_4] = e_2, \quad [e_3, e_4] = \beta e_3, \quad -1 \leq \beta \leq 1;$$

- ${\mathfrak g}_{4.9}$, indecomposable solvable,

$$[e_2, e_3] = e_1, \quad [e_1, e_4] = 2 \alpha e_1, \quad [e_2, e_4] = \alpha e_2 - e_3, \quad [e_3, e_4] = e_2 + \alpha e_3, \quad \alpha \geq 0;$$

- ${\mathfrak g}_{4.10}$, indecomposable solvable,

$$[e_1, e_3] = e_1, \quad [e_2, e_3] = e_2, \quad [e_1, e_4] = -e_2, \quad [e_2, e_4] = e_1.$$

Algebra ${\mathfrak g}_{4.3}$ can be considered as an extreme case of ${\mathfrak g}_{4.2}$, when $\beta \rightarrow 0$, forming contraction of Lie algebra.

Over the field ${\mathbb C}$ algebras ${\mathfrak g}_{3.5} \oplus {\mathfrak g}_1$, ${\mathfrak g}_{3.7} \oplus {\mathfrak g}_1$, ${\mathfrak g}_{4.6}$, ${\mathfrak g}_{4.9}$, ${\mathfrak g}_{4.10}$ are isomorphic to ${\mathfrak g}_{3.4} \oplus {\mathfrak g}_1$, ${\mathfrak g}_{3.6} \oplus {\mathfrak g}_1$, ${\mathfrak g}_{4.5}$, ${\mathfrak g}_{4.8}$, ${2\mathfrak g}_{2.1}$, respectively.

== See also ==
- Table of Lie groups
- Simple Lie group#Full classification
