= Uniform 6-polytope =

Uniform 6-dimensional polytope

Graphs of three regular and related uniform polytopes
6-simplex	Truncated 6-simplex	Rectified 6-simplex
Cantellated 6-simplex		Runcinated 6-simplex
Stericated 6-simplex		Pentellated 6-simplex
6-orthoplex	Truncated 6-orthoplex	Rectified 6-orthoplex
Cantellated 6-orthoplex	Runcinated 6-orthoplex	Stericated 6-orthoplex
Cantellated 6-cube		Runcinated 6-cube
Stericated 6-cube		Pentellated 6-cube
6-cube	Truncated 6-cube	Rectified 6-cube
6-demicube	Truncated 6-demicube	Cantellated 6-demicube
Runcinated 6-demicube		Stericated 6-demicube
2_{21}		1_{22}
Truncated 2_{21}		Truncated 1_{22}

In six-dimensional geometry, a uniform 6-polytope is a six-dimensional uniform polytope. A uniform polypeton is vertex-transitive, and all facets are uniform 5-polytopes.

The complete set of convex uniform 6-polytopes has not been determined, but most can be made as Wythoff constructions from a small set of symmetry groups. These construction operations are represented by the permutations of rings of the Coxeter-Dynkin diagrams. Each combination of at least one ring on every connected group of nodes in the diagram produces a uniform 6-polytope.

The simplest uniform polypeta are regular polypeta: the 6-simplex {3,3,3,3,3}, the 6-cube (hexeract) {4,3,3,3,3}, and the 6-orthoplex (hexacross) {3,3,3,3,4}.

== History of discovery ==
- Regular polytopes: (convex faces)
  - 1852: Ludwig Schläfli proved in his manuscript Theorie der vielfachen Kontinuität that there are exactly 3 regular polytopes in 5 or more dimensions.
- Convex semiregular polytopes: (Various definitions before Coxeter's uniform category)
  - 1900: Thorold Gosset enumerated the list of nonprismatic semiregular convex polytopes with regular facets (convex regular polytera) in his publication On the Regular and Semi-Regular Figures in Space of n Dimensions.
- Convex uniform polytopes:
  - 1940: The search was expanded systematically by H.S.M. Coxeter in his publication Regular and Semi-Regular Polytopes.
- Nonregular uniform star polytopes: (similar to the nonconvex uniform polyhedra)
  - Ongoing: Jonathan Bowers and other researchers search for other non-convex uniform 6-polytopes, with a current count of 41348 known uniform 6-polytopes outside infinite families (convex and non-convex), excluding the prisms of the uniform 5-polytopes. The list is not proven complete.

== Uniform 6-polytopes by fundamental Coxeter groups ==
Uniform 6-polytopes with reflective symmetry can be generated by these four Coxeter groups, represented by permutations of rings of the Coxeter-Dynkin diagrams.

There are four fundamental reflective symmetry groups which generate 153 unique uniform 6-polytopes.

#	Coxeter group		Coxeter-Dynkin diagram
1	A_{6}	[3,3,3,3,3]	
2	B_{6}	[3,3,3,3,4]	
3	D_{6}	[3,3,3,3^{1,1}]	
4	E_{6}	[3^{2,2,1}]	
4	E_{6}	[3,3^{2,2}]	

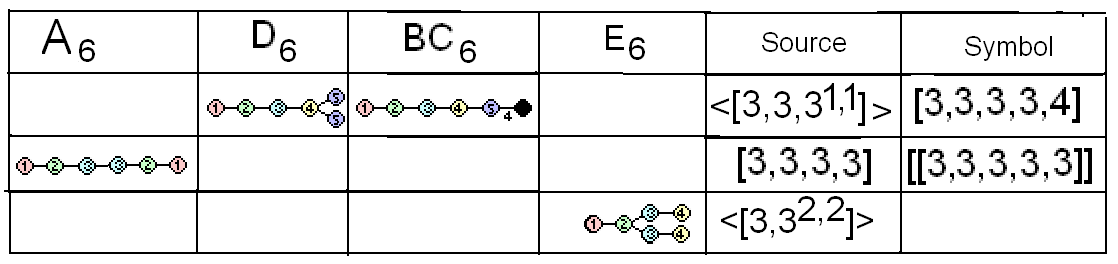
Coxeter-Dynkin diagram correspondences between families and higher symmetry within diagrams. Nodes of the same color in each row represent identical mirrors. Black nodes are not active in the correspondence.

== Uniform prismatic families ==
Uniform prism

There are 6 categorical uniform prisms based on the uniform 5-polytopes.

#	Coxeter group		Notes
1	A_{5}A_{1}	[3,3,3,3,2]	Prism family based on 5-simplex
2	B_{5}A_{1}	[4,3,3,3,2]	Prism family based on 5-cube
3a	D_{5}A_{1}	[3^{2,1,1},2]	Prism family based on 5-demicube

#	Coxeter group		Notes
4	A_{3}I_{2}(p)A_{1}	[3,3,2,p,2]	Prism family based on tetrahedral-p-gonal duoprisms
5	B_{3}I_{2}(p)A_{1}	[4,3,2,p,2]	Prism family based on cubic-p-gonal duoprisms
6	H_{3}I_{2}(p)A_{1}	[5,3,2,p,2]	Prism family based on dodecahedral-p-gonal duoprisms

Uniform duoprism

There are 11 categorical uniform duoprismatic families of polytopes based on Cartesian products of lower-dimensional uniform polytopes. Five are formed as the product of a uniform 4-polytope with a regular polygon, and six are formed by the product of two uniform polyhedra:

#	Coxeter group		Notes
1	A_{4}I_{2}(p)	[3,3,3,2,p]	Family based on 5-cell-p-gonal duoprisms.
2	B_{4}I_{2}(p)	[4,3,3,2,p]	Family based on tesseract-p-gonal duoprisms.
3	F_{4}I_{2}(p)	[3,4,3,2,p]	Family based on 24-cell-p-gonal duoprisms.
4	H_{4}I_{2}(p)	[5,3,3,2,p]	Family based on 120-cell-p-gonal duoprisms.
5	D_{4}I_{2}(p)	[3^{1,1,1},2,p]	Family based on demitesseract-p-gonal duoprisms.

#	Coxeter group		Notes
6	A_{3}^{2}	[3,3,2,3,3]	Family based on tetrahedral duoprisms.
7	A_{3}B_{3}	[3,3,2,4,3]	Family based on tetrahedral-cubic duoprisms.
8	A_{3}H_{3}	[3,3,2,5,3]	Family based on tetrahedral-dodecahedral duoprisms.
9	B_{3}^{2}	[4,3,2,4,3]	Family based on cubic duoprisms.
10	B_{3}H_{3}	[4,3,2,5,3]	Family based on cubic-dodecahedral duoprisms.
11	H_{3}^{2}	[5,3,2,5,3]	Family based on dodecahedral duoprisms.

Uniform triaprism

There is one infinite family of uniform triaprismatic families of polytopes constructed as a Cartesian products of three regular polygons. Each combination of at least one ring on every connected group produces a uniform prismatic 6-polytope.

#	Coxeter group		Notes
1	I_{2}(p)I_{2}(q)I_{2}(r)	[p,2,q,2,r]	Family based on p,q,r-gonal triprisms

== Enumerating the convex uniform 6-polytopes ==
- Simplex family: A_{6} [3^{4}] -
  - 35 uniform 6-polytopes as permutations of rings in the group diagram, including one regular:
    1. {3^{4}} - 6-simplex -
- Hypercube/orthoplex family: B_{6} [4,3^{4}] -
  - 63 uniform 6-polytopes as permutations of rings in the group diagram, including two regular forms:
    1. {4,3^{3}} — 6-cube (hexeract) -
    2. {3^{3},4} — 6-orthoplex, (hexacross) -
- Demihypercube D_{6} family: [3^{3,1,1}] -
  - 47 uniform 6-polytopes (16 unique) as permutations of rings in the group diagram, including:
    1. {3,3^{2,1}}, 1_{21} 6-demicube (demihexeract) -; also as h{4,3^{3}} -
    2. {3,3,3^{1,1}}, 2_{11} 6-orthoplex -, a half symmetry form of.
- E_{6} family: [3^{3,1,1}] -
  - 39 uniform 6-polytopes as permutations of rings in the group diagram, including:
    1. {3,3,3^{2,1}}, 2_{21} -
    2. {3,3^{2,2}}, 1_{22} -

These fundamental families generate 153 nonprismatic convex uniform polypeta.

In addition, there are 57 uniform 6-polytope constructions based on prisms of the uniform 5-polytopes: [3,3,3,3,2], [4,3,3,3,2], [3^{2,1,1},2], excluding the penteract prism as a duplicate of the hexeract.

In addition, there are infinitely many uniform 6-polytope based on:

1. Duoprism prism families: [3,3,2,p,2], [4,3,2,p,2], [5,3,2,p,2].
2. Duoprism families: [3,3,3,2,p], [4,3,3,2,p], [5,3,3,2,p].
3. Triaprism family: [p,2,q,2,r].

=== The A_{6} family ===
There are 32+4−1=35 forms, derived by marking one or more nodes of the Coxeter-Dynkin diagram. All 35 are enumerated below. They are named by Norman Johnson from the Wythoff construction operations upon regular 6-simplex (heptapeton). Bowers-style acronym names are given in parentheses for cross-referencing.

The A_{6} family has symmetry of order 5040 (7 factorial).

The coordinates of uniform 6-polytopes with 6-simplex symmetry can be generated as permutations of simple integers in 7-space, all in hyperplanes with normal vector (1,1,1,1,1,1,1).

#	Coxeter-Dynkin	Johnson naming system Bowers name and (acronym)	Base point	Element counts					
#	Coxeter-Dynkin	Johnson naming system Bowers name and (acronym)	Base point	5	4	3	2	1	0
1		6-simplex heptapeton (hop)	(0,0,0,0,0,0,1)	7	21	35	35	21	7
2		Rectified 6-simplex rectified heptapeton (ril)	(0,0,0,0,0,1,1)	14	63	140	175	105	21
3		Truncated 6-simplex truncated heptapeton (til)	(0,0,0,0,0,1,2)	14	63	140	175	126	42
4		Birectified 6-simplex birectified heptapeton (bril)	(0,0,0,0,1,1,1)	14	84	245	350	210	35
5		Cantellated 6-simplex small rhombated heptapeton (sril)	(0,0,0,0,1,1,2)	35	210	560	805	525	105
6		Bitruncated 6-simplex bitruncated heptapeton (batal)	(0,0,0,0,1,2,2)	14	84	245	385	315	105
7		Cantitruncated 6-simplex great rhombated heptapeton (gril)	(0,0,0,0,1,2,3)	35	210	560	805	630	210
8		Runcinated 6-simplex small prismated heptapeton (spil)	(0,0,0,1,1,1,2)	70	455	1330	1610	840	140
9		Bicantellated 6-simplex small birhombated heptapeton (sabril)	(0,0,0,1,1,2,2)	70	455	1295	1610	840	140
10		Runcitruncated 6-simplex prismatotruncated heptapeton (patal)	(0,0,0,1,1,2,3)	70	560	1820	2800	1890	420
11		Tritruncated 6-simplex tetradecapeton (fe)	(0,0,0,1,2,2,2)	14	84	280	490	420	140
12		Runcicantellated 6-simplex prismatorhombated heptapeton (pril)	(0,0,0,1,2,2,3)	70	455	1295	1960	1470	420
13		Bicantitruncated 6-simplex great birhombated heptapeton (gabril)	(0,0,0,1,2,3,3)	49	329	980	1540	1260	420
14		Runcicantitruncated 6-simplex great prismated heptapeton (gapil)	(0,0,0,1,2,3,4)	70	560	1820	3010	2520	840
15		Stericated 6-simplex small cellated heptapeton (scal)	(0,0,1,1,1,1,2)	105	700	1470	1400	630	105
16		Biruncinated 6-simplex small biprismato-tetradecapeton (sibpof)	(0,0,1,1,1,2,2)	84	714	2100	2520	1260	210
17		Steritruncated 6-simplex cellitruncated heptapeton (catal)	(0,0,1,1,1,2,3)	105	945	2940	3780	2100	420
18		Stericantellated 6-simplex cellirhombated heptapeton (cral)	(0,0,1,1,2,2,3)	105	1050	3465	5040	3150	630
19		Biruncitruncated 6-simplex biprismatorhombated heptapeton (bapril)	(0,0,1,1,2,3,3)	84	714	2310	3570	2520	630
20		Stericantitruncated 6-simplex celligreatorhombated heptapeton (cagral)	(0,0,1,1,2,3,4)	105	1155	4410	7140	5040	1260
21		Steriruncinated 6-simplex celliprismated heptapeton (copal)	(0,0,1,2,2,2,3)	105	700	1995	2660	1680	420
22		Steriruncitruncated 6-simplex celliprismatotruncated heptapeton (captal)	(0,0,1,2,2,3,4)	105	945	3360	5670	4410	1260
23		Steriruncicantellated 6-simplex celliprismatorhombated heptapeton (copril)	(0,0,1,2,3,3,4)	105	1050	3675	5880	4410	1260
24		Biruncicantitruncated 6-simplex great biprismato-tetradecapeton (gibpof)	(0,0,1,2,3,4,4)	84	714	2520	4410	3780	1260
25		Steriruncicantitruncated 6-simplex great cellated heptapeton (gacal)	(0,0,1,2,3,4,5)	105	1155	4620	8610	7560	2520
26		Pentellated 6-simplex small teri-tetradecapeton (staff)	(0,1,1,1,1,1,2)	126	434	630	490	210	42
27		Pentitruncated 6-simplex teracellated heptapeton (tocal)	(0,1,1,1,1,2,3)	126	826	1785	1820	945	210
28		Penticantellated 6-simplex teriprismated heptapeton (topal)	(0,1,1,1,2,2,3)	126	1246	3570	4340	2310	420
29		Penticantitruncated 6-simplex terigreatorhombated heptapeton (togral)	(0,1,1,1,2,3,4)	126	1351	4095	5390	3360	840
30		Pentiruncitruncated 6-simplex tericellirhombated heptapeton (tocral)	(0,1,1,2,2,3,4)	126	1491	5565	8610	5670	1260
31		Pentiruncicantellated 6-simplex teriprismatorhombi-tetradecapeton (taporf)	(0,1,1,2,3,3,4)	126	1596	5250	7560	5040	1260
32		Pentiruncicantitruncated 6-simplex terigreatoprismated heptapeton (tagopal)	(0,1,1,2,3,4,5)	126	1701	6825	11550	8820	2520
33		Pentisteritruncated 6-simplex tericellitrunki-tetradecapeton (tactaf)	(0,1,2,2,2,3,4)	126	1176	3780	5250	3360	840
34		Pentistericantitruncated 6-simplex tericelligreatorhombated heptapeton (tacogral)	(0,1,2,2,3,4,5)	126	1596	6510	11340	8820	2520
35		Omnitruncated 6-simplex great teri-tetradecapeton (gotaf)	(0,1,2,3,4,5,6)	126	1806	8400	16800	15120	5040

=== The B_{6} family ===
There are 63 forms based on all permutations of the Coxeter-Dynkin diagrams with one or more rings.

The B_{6} family has symmetry of order 46080 (6 factorial x 2^{6}).

They are named by Norman Johnson from the Wythoff construction operations upon the regular 6-cube and 6-orthoplex. Bowers names and acronym names are given for cross-referencing.

#	Coxeter-Dynkin diagram	Schläfli symbol	Names	Element counts					
#	Coxeter-Dynkin diagram	Schläfli symbol	Names	5	4	3	2	1	0
36		t_{0}{3,3,3,3,4}	6-orthoplex Hexacontatetrapeton (gee)	64	192	240	160	60	12
37		t_{1}{3,3,3,3,4}	Rectified 6-orthoplex Rectified hexacontatetrapeton (rag)	76	576	1200	1120	480	60
38		t_{2}{3,3,3,3,4}	Birectified 6-orthoplex Birectified hexacontatetrapeton (brag)	76	636	2160	2880	1440	160
39		t_{2}{4,3,3,3,3}	Birectified 6-cube Birectified hexeract (brox)	76	636	2080	3200	1920	240
40		t_{1}{4,3,3,3,3}	Rectified 6-cube Rectified hexeract (rax)	76	444	1120	1520	960	192
41		t_{0}{4,3,3,3,3}	6-cube Hexeract (ax)	12	60	160	240	192	64
42		t_{0,1}{3,3,3,3,4}	Truncated 6-orthoplex Truncated hexacontatetrapeton (tag)	76	576	1200	1120	540	120
43		t_{0,2}{3,3,3,3,4}	Cantellated 6-orthoplex Small rhombated hexacontatetrapeton (srog)	136	1656	5040	6400	3360	480
44		t_{1,2}{3,3,3,3,4}	Bitruncated 6-orthoplex Bitruncated hexacontatetrapeton (botag)					1920	480
45		t_{0,3}{3,3,3,3,4}	Runcinated 6-orthoplex Small prismated hexacontatetrapeton (spog)					7200	960
46		t_{1,3}{3,3,3,3,4}	Bicantellated 6-orthoplex Small birhombated hexacontatetrapeton (siborg)					8640	1440
47		t_{2,3}{4,3,3,3,3}	Tritruncated 6-cube Hexeractihexacontatetrapeton (xog)					3360	960
48		t_{0,4}{3,3,3,3,4}	Stericated 6-orthoplex Small cellated hexacontatetrapeton (scag)					5760	960
49		t_{1,4}{4,3,3,3,3}	Biruncinated 6-cube Small biprismato-hexeractihexacontatetrapeton (sobpoxog)					11520	1920
50		t_{1,3}{4,3,3,3,3}	Bicantellated 6-cube Small birhombated hexeract (saborx)					9600	1920
51		t_{1,2}{4,3,3,3,3}	Bitruncated 6-cube Bitruncated hexeract (botox)					2880	960
52		t_{0,5}{4,3,3,3,3}	Pentellated 6-cube Small teri-hexeractihexacontatetrapeton (stoxog)					1920	384
53		t_{0,4}{4,3,3,3,3}	Stericated 6-cube Small cellated hexeract (scox)					5760	960
54		t_{0,3}{4,3,3,3,3}	Runcinated 6-cube Small prismated hexeract (spox)					7680	1280
55		t_{0,2}{4,3,3,3,3}	Cantellated 6-cube Small rhombated hexeract (srox)					4800	960
56		t_{0,1}{4,3,3,3,3}	Truncated 6-cube Truncated hexeract (tox)	76	444	1120	1520	1152	384
57		t_{0,1,2}{3,3,3,3,4}	Cantitruncated 6-orthoplex Great rhombated hexacontatetrapeton (grog)					3840	960
58		t_{0,1,3}{3,3,3,3,4}	Runcitruncated 6-orthoplex Prismatotruncated hexacontatetrapeton (potag)					15840	2880
59		t_{0,2,3}{3,3,3,3,4}	Runcicantellated 6-orthoplex Prismatorhombated hexacontatetrapeton (prog)					11520	2880
60		t_{1,2,3}{3,3,3,3,4}	Bicantitruncated 6-orthoplex Great birhombated hexacontatetrapeton (gaborg)					10080	2880
61		t_{0,1,4}{3,3,3,3,4}	Steritruncated 6-orthoplex Cellitruncated hexacontatetrapeton (catog)					19200	3840
62		t_{0,2,4}{3,3,3,3,4}	Stericantellated 6-orthoplex Cellirhombated hexacontatetrapeton (crag)					28800	5760
63		t_{1,2,4}{3,3,3,3,4}	Biruncitruncated 6-orthoplex Biprismatotruncated hexacontatetrapeton (boprax)					23040	5760
64		t_{0,3,4}{3,3,3,3,4}	Steriruncinated 6-orthoplex Celliprismated hexacontatetrapeton (copog)					15360	3840
65		t_{1,2,4}{4,3,3,3,3}	Biruncitruncated 6-cube Biprismatotruncated hexeract (boprag)					23040	5760
66		t_{1,2,3}{4,3,3,3,3}	Bicantitruncated 6-cube Great birhombated hexeract (gaborx)					11520	3840
67		t_{0,1,5}{3,3,3,3,4}	Pentitruncated 6-orthoplex Teritruncated hexacontatetrapeton (tacox)					8640	1920
68		t_{0,2,5}{3,3,3,3,4}	Penticantellated 6-orthoplex Terirhombated hexacontatetrapeton (tapox)					21120	3840
69		t_{0,3,4}{4,3,3,3,3}	Steriruncinated 6-cube Celliprismated hexeract (copox)					15360	3840
70		t_{0,2,5}{4,3,3,3,3}	Penticantellated 6-cube Terirhombated hexeract (topag)					21120	3840
71		t_{0,2,4}{4,3,3,3,3}	Stericantellated 6-cube Cellirhombated hexeract (crax)					28800	5760
72		t_{0,2,3}{4,3,3,3,3}	Runcicantellated 6-cube Prismatorhombated hexeract (prox)					13440	3840
73		t_{0,1,5}{4,3,3,3,3}	Pentitruncated 6-cube Teritruncated hexeract (tacog)					8640	1920
74		t_{0,1,4}{4,3,3,3,3}	Steritruncated 6-cube Cellitruncated hexeract (catax)					19200	3840
75		t_{0,1,3}{4,3,3,3,3}	Runcitruncated 6-cube Prismatotruncated hexeract (potax)					17280	3840
76		t_{0,1,2}{4,3,3,3,3}	Cantitruncated 6-cube Great rhombated hexeract (grox)					5760	1920
77		t_{0,1,2,3}{3,3,3,3,4}	Runcicantitruncated 6-orthoplex Great prismated hexacontatetrapeton (gopog)					20160	5760
78		t_{0,1,2,4}{3,3,3,3,4}	Stericantitruncated 6-orthoplex Celligreatorhombated hexacontatetrapeton (cagorg)					46080	11520
79		t_{0,1,3,4}{3,3,3,3,4}	Steriruncitruncated 6-orthoplex Celliprismatotruncated hexacontatetrapeton (captog)					40320	11520
80		t_{0,2,3,4}{3,3,3,3,4}	Steriruncicantellated 6-orthoplex Celliprismatorhombated hexacontatetrapeton (coprag)					40320	11520
81		t_{1,2,3,4}{4,3,3,3,3}	Biruncicantitruncated 6-cube Great biprismato-hexeractihexacontatetrapeton (gobpoxog)					34560	11520
82		t_{0,1,2,5}{3,3,3,3,4}	Penticantitruncated 6-orthoplex Terigreatorhombated hexacontatetrapeton (togrig)					30720	7680
83		t_{0,1,3,5}{3,3,3,3,4}	Pentiruncitruncated 6-orthoplex Teriprismatotruncated hexacontatetrapeton (tocrax)					51840	11520
84		t_{0,2,3,5}{4,3,3,3,3}	Pentiruncicantellated 6-cube Teriprismatorhombi-hexeractihexacontatetrapeton (tiprixog)					46080	11520
85		t_{0,2,3,4}{4,3,3,3,3}	Steriruncicantellated 6-cube Celliprismatorhombated hexeract (coprix)					40320	11520
86		t_{0,1,4,5}{4,3,3,3,3}	Pentisteritruncated 6-cube Tericelli-hexeractihexacontatetrapeton (tactaxog)					30720	7680
87		t_{0,1,3,5}{4,3,3,3,3}	Pentiruncitruncated 6-cube Teriprismatotruncated hexeract (tocrag)					51840	11520
88		t_{0,1,3,4}{4,3,3,3,3}	Steriruncitruncated 6-cube Celliprismatotruncated hexeract (captix)					40320	11520
89		t_{0,1,2,5}{4,3,3,3,3}	Penticantitruncated 6-cube Terigreatorhombated hexeract (togrix)					30720	7680
90		t_{0,1,2,4}{4,3,3,3,3}	Stericantitruncated 6-cube Celligreatorhombated hexeract (cagorx)					46080	11520
91		t_{0,1,2,3}{4,3,3,3,3}	Runcicantitruncated 6-cube Great prismated hexeract (gippox)					23040	7680
92		t_{0,1,2,3,4}{3,3,3,3,4}	Steriruncicantitruncated 6-orthoplex Great cellated hexacontatetrapeton (gocog)					69120	23040
93		t_{0,1,2,3,5}{3,3,3,3,4}	Pentiruncicantitruncated 6-orthoplex Terigreatoprismated hexacontatetrapeton (tagpog)					80640	23040
94		t_{0,1,2,4,5}{3,3,3,3,4}	Pentistericantitruncated 6-orthoplex Tericelligreatorhombated hexacontatetrapeton (tecagorg)					80640	23040
95		t_{0,1,2,4,5}{4,3,3,3,3}	Pentistericantitruncated 6-cube Tericelligreatorhombated hexeract (tocagrax)					80640	23040
96		t_{0,1,2,3,5}{4,3,3,3,3}	Pentiruncicantitruncated 6-cube Terigreatoprismated hexeract (tagpox)					80640	23040
97		t_{0,1,2,3,4}{4,3,3,3,3}	Steriruncicantitruncated 6-cube Great cellated hexeract (gocax)					69120	23040
98		t_{0,1,2,3,4,5}{4,3,3,3,3}	Omnitruncated 6-cube Great teri-hexeractihexacontatetrapeton (gotaxog)					138240	46080

=== The D_{6} family ===
The D_{6} family has symmetry of order 23040 (6 factorial x 2^{5}).

This family has 3×16−1=47 Wythoffian uniform polytopes, generated by marking one or more nodes of the D_{6} Coxeter-Dynkin diagram. Of these, 31 (2×16−1) are repeated from the B_{6} family and 16 are unique to this family. The 16 unique forms are enumerated below. Bowers-style acronym names are given for cross-referencing.

#	Coxeter diagram	Names	Base point (Alternately signed)	Element counts						Circumrad
#	Coxeter diagram	Names	Base point (Alternately signed)	5	4	3	2	1	0	Circumrad
99	=	6-demicube Hemihexeract (hax)	(1,1,1,1,1,1)	44	252	640	640	240	32	0.8660254
100	=	Cantic 6-cube Truncated hemihexeract (thax)	(1,1,3,3,3,3)	76	636	2080	3200	2160	480	2.1794493
101	=	Runcic 6-cube Small rhombated hemihexeract (sirhax)	(1,1,1,3,3,3)					3840	640	1.9364916
102	=	Steric 6-cube Small prismated hemihexeract (sophax)	(1,1,1,1,3,3)					3360	480	1.6583123
103	=	Pentic 6-cube Small cellated demihexeract (sochax)	(1,1,1,1,1,3)					1440	192	1.3228756
104	=	Runcicantic 6-cube Great rhombated hemihexeract (girhax)	(1,1,3,5,5,5)					5760	1920	3.2787192
105	=	Stericantic 6-cube Prismatotruncated hemihexeract (pithax)	(1,1,3,3,5,5)					12960	2880	2.95804
106	=	Steriruncic 6-cube Prismatorhombated hemihexeract (prohax)	(1,1,1,3,5,5)					7680	1920	2.7838821
107	=	Penticantic 6-cube Cellitruncated hemihexeract (cathix)	(1,1,3,3,3,5)					9600	1920	2.5980761
108	=	Pentiruncic 6-cube Cellirhombated hemihexeract (crohax)	(1,1,1,3,3,5)					10560	1920	2.3979158
109	=	Pentisteric 6-cube Celliprismated hemihexeract (cophix)	(1,1,1,1,3,5)					5280	960	2.1794496
110	=	Steriruncicantic 6-cube Great prismated hemihexeract (gophax)	(1,1,3,5,7,7)					17280	5760	4.0926762
111	=	Pentiruncicantic 6-cube Celligreatorhombated hemihexeract (cagrohax)	(1,1,3,5,5,7)					20160	5760	3.7080991
112	=	Pentistericantic 6-cube Celliprismatotruncated hemihexeract (capthix)	(1,1,3,3,5,7)					23040	5760	3.4278274
113	=	Pentisteriruncic 6-cube Celliprismatorhombated hemihexeract (caprohax)	(1,1,1,3,5,7)					15360	3840	3.2787192
114	=	Pentisteriruncicantic 6-cube Great cellated hemihexeract (gochax)	(1,1,3,5,7,9)					34560	11520	4.5552168

=== The E_{6} family ===
There are 39 forms based on all permutations of the Coxeter-Dynkin diagrams with one or more rings. Bowers-style acronym names are given for cross-referencing. The E_{6} family has symmetry of order 51,840.

#	Coxeter diagram	Names (acronym)	Element counts					
#	Coxeter diagram	Names (acronym)	5-faces	4-faces	Cells	Faces	Edges	Vertices
115		2_{21} Icosiheptaheptacontadipeton (jak)	99	648	1080	720	216	27
116		Rectified 2_{21} Rectified icosiheptaheptacontadipeton (rojak)	126	1350	4320	5040	2160	216
117		Truncated 2_{21} Truncated icosiheptaheptacontadipeton (tojak)	126	1350	4320	5040	2376	432
118		Cantellated 2_{21} Small rhombated icosiheptaheptacontadipeton (sirjak)	342	3942	15120	24480	15120	2160
119		Runcinated 2_{21} Small demiprismated icosiheptaheptacontadipeton (shopjak)	342	4662	16200	19440	8640	1080
120		Demified icosiheptaheptacontadipeton (hejak)	342	2430	7200	7920	3240	432
121		Bitruncated 2_{21} Bitruncated icosiheptaheptacontadipeton (botajik)						2160
122		Demirectified icosiheptaheptacontadipeton (harjak)						1080
123		Cantitruncated 2_{21} Great rhombated icosiheptaheptacontadipeton (girjak)						4320
124		Runcitruncated 2_{21} Demiprismatotruncated icosiheptaheptacontadipeton (hopitjak)						4320
125		Steritruncated 2_{21} Cellitruncated icosiheptaheptacontadipeton (catjak)						2160
126		Demitruncated icosiheptaheptacontadipeton (hotjak)						2160
127		Runcicantellated 2_{21} Demiprismatorhombated icosiheptaheptacontadipeton (haprojak)						6480
128		Small demirhombated icosiheptaheptacontadipeton (shorjak)						4320
129		Small prismated icosiheptaheptacontadipeton (spojak)						4320
130		Tritruncated icosiheptaheptacontadipeton (titajak)						4320
131		Runcicantitruncated 2_{21} Great demiprismated icosiheptaheptacontadipeton (ghopjak)						12960
132		Stericantitruncated 2_{21} Celligreatorhombated icosiheptaheptacontadipeton (cograjik)						12960
133		Great demirhombated icosiheptaheptacontadipeton (ghorjak)						8640
134		Prismatotruncated icosiheptaheptacontadipeton (potjak)						12960
135		Demicellitruncated icosiheptaheptacontadipeton (hictijik)						8640
136		Prismatorhombated icosiheptaheptacontadipeton (projak)						12960
137		Great prismated icosiheptaheptacontadipeton (gapjak)						25920
138		Demicelligreatorhombated icosiheptaheptacontadipeton (hocgarjik)						25920

#	Coxeter diagram	Names	Element counts					
#	Coxeter diagram	Names	5-faces	4-faces	Cells	Faces	Edges	Vertices
139	=	1_{22} Pentacontatetrapeton (mo)	54	702	2160	2160	720	72
140	=	Rectified 1_{22} Rectified pentacontatetrapeton (ram)	126	1566	6480	10800	6480	720
141	=	Birectified 1_{22} Birectified pentacontatetrapeton (barm)	126	2286	10800	19440	12960	2160
142	=	Trirectified 1_{22} Trirectified pentacontatetrapeton (trim)	558	4608	8640	6480	2160	270
143	=	Truncated 1_{22} Truncated pentacontatetrapeton (tim)					13680	1440
144	=	Bitruncated 1_{22} Bitruncated pentacontatetrapeton (bitem)						6480
145	=	Tritruncated 1_{22} Tritruncated pentacontatetrapeton (titam)						8640
146	=	Cantellated 1_{22} Small rhombated pentacontatetrapeton (sram)						6480
147	=	Cantitruncated 1_{22} Great rhombated pentacontatetrapeton (gram)						12960
148	=	Runcinated 1_{22} Small prismated pentacontatetrapeton (spam)						2160
149	=	Bicantellated 1_{22} Small birhombated pentacontatetrapeton (sabrim)						6480
150	=	Bicantitruncated 1_{22} Great birhombated pentacontatetrapeton (gabrim)						12960
151	=	Runcitruncated 1_{22} Prismatotruncated pentacontatetrapeton (patom)						12960
152	=	Runcicantellated 1_{22} Prismatorhombated pentacontatetrapeton (prom)						25920
153	=	Omnitruncated 1_{22} Great prismated pentacontatetrapeton (gopam)						51840

=== Triaprisms ===
Uniform triaprisms, {p}×{q}×{r}, form an infinite class for all integers p,q,r>2. {4}×{4}×{4} makes a lower symmetry form of the 6-cube.

The extended f-vector is (p,p,1)*(q,q,1)*(r,r,1)=(pqr,3pqr,3pqr+pq+pr+qr,3p(p+1),3p,1).

Coxeter diagram	Names	Element counts					
Coxeter diagram	Names	5-faces	4-faces	Cells	Faces	Edges	Vertices
	{p}×{q}×{r}	p+q+r	pq+pr+qr+p+q+r	pqr+2(pq+pr+qr)	3pqr+pq+pr+qr	3pqr	pqr
	{p}×{p}×{p}	3p	3p(p+1)	p^{2}(p+6)	3p^{2}(p+1)	3p^{3}	p^{3}
	{3}×{3}×{3} (trittip)	9	36	81	99	81	27
	{4}×{4}×{4} = 6-cube	12	60	160	240	192	64

=== Non-Wythoffian 6-polytopes ===
In 6 dimensions, there are an infinite amount of non-Wythoffian convex uniform polytopes: the Cartesian product of the grand antiprism in 4 dimensions and any regular polygon in 2 dimensions. (In higher than 6 dimensions the same is true because one can repeatedly take prisms.) It is not yet proven whether or not there are more.

== Regular and uniform honeycombs ==
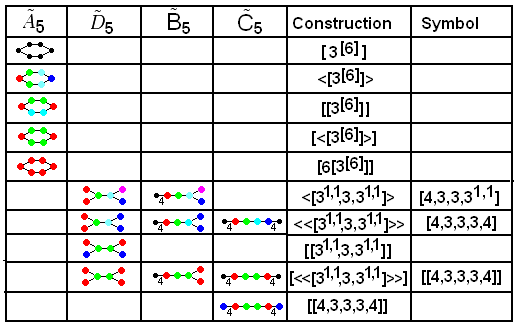
Coxeter-Dynkin diagram correspondences between families and higher symmetry within diagrams. Nodes of the same color in each row represent identical mirrors. Black nodes are not active in the correspondence.

There are four fundamental affine Coxeter groups and 27 prismatic groups that generate regular and uniform tessellations in 5-space:

#	Coxeter group		Coxeter diagram	Forms
1	${\tilde{A}}_5$	[3^{[6]}]		12
2	${\tilde{C}}_5$	[4,3^{3},4]		35
3	${\tilde{B}}_5$	[4,3,3^{1,1}] [4,3^{3},4,1^{+}]		47 (16 new)
4	${\tilde{D}}_5$	[3^{1,1},3,3^{1,1}] [1^{+},4,3^{3},4,1^{+}]		20 (3 new)

Regular and uniform honeycombs include:

- ${\tilde{A}}_5$ There are 12 unique uniform honeycombs, including:
  - 5-simplex honeycomb
  - Truncated 5-simplex honeycomb
  - Omnitruncated 5-simplex honeycomb
- ${\tilde{C}}_5$ There are 35 uniform honeycombs, including:
  - Regular hypercube honeycomb of Euclidean 5-space, the 5-cube honeycomb, with symbols {4,3^{3},4}, =
- ${\tilde{B}}_5$ There are 47 uniform honeycombs, 16 new, including:
  - The uniform alternated hypercube honeycomb, 5-demicubic honeycomb, with symbols h{4,3^{3},4}, = =
- ${\tilde{D}}_5$, [3^{1,1},3,3^{1,1}]: There are 20 unique ringed permutations, and 3 new ones. Coxeter calls the first one a quarter 5-cubic honeycomb, with symbols q{4,3^{3},4}, =. The other two new ones are =, =.

Prismatic groups
#	Coxeter group		Coxeter-Dynkin diagram
1	${\tilde{A}}_4$x${\tilde{I}}_1$	[3^{[5]},2,∞]	
2	${\tilde{B}}_4$x${\tilde{I}}_1$	[4,3,3^{1,1},2,∞]	
3	${\tilde{C}}_4$x${\tilde{I}}_1$	[4,3,3,4,2,∞]	
4	${\tilde{D}}_4$x${\tilde{I}}_1$	[3^{1,1,1,1},2,∞]	
5	${\tilde{F}}_4$x${\tilde{I}}_1$	[3,4,3,3,2,∞]	
6	${\tilde{C}}_3$x${\tilde{I}}_1$x${\tilde{I}}_1$	[4,3,4,2,∞,2,∞]	
7	${\tilde{B}}_3$x${\tilde{I}}_1$x${\tilde{I}}_1$	[4,3^{1,1},2,∞,2,∞]	
8	${\tilde{A}}_3$x${\tilde{I}}_1$x${\tilde{I}}_1$	[3^{[4]},2,∞,2,∞]	
9	${\tilde{C}}_2$x${\tilde{I}}_1$x${\tilde{I}}_1$x${\tilde{I}}_1$	[4,4,2,∞,2,∞,2,∞]	
10	${\tilde{H}}_2$x${\tilde{I}}_1$x${\tilde{I}}_1$x${\tilde{I}}_1$	[6,3,2,∞,2,∞,2,∞]	
11	${\tilde{A}}_2$x${\tilde{I}}_1$x${\tilde{I}}_1$x${\tilde{I}}_1$	[3^{[3]},2,∞,2,∞,2,∞]	
12	${\tilde{I}}_1$x${\tilde{I}}_1$x${\tilde{I}}_1$x${\tilde{I}}_1$x${\tilde{I}}_1$	[∞,2,∞,2,∞,2,∞,2,∞]	
13	${\tilde{A}}_2$x${\tilde{A}}_2$x${\tilde{I}}_1$	[3^{[3]},2,3^{[3]},2,∞]	
14	${\tilde{A}}_2$x${\tilde{B}}_2$x${\tilde{I}}_1$	[3^{[3]},2,4,4,2,∞]	
15	${\tilde{A}}_2$x${\tilde{G}}_2$x${\tilde{I}}_1$	[3^{[3]},2,6,3,2,∞]	
16	${\tilde{B}}_2$x${\tilde{B}}_2$x${\tilde{I}}_1$	[4,4,2,4,4,2,∞]	
17	${\tilde{B}}_2$x${\tilde{G}}_2$x${\tilde{I}}_1$	[4,4,2,6,3,2,∞]	
18	${\tilde{G}}_2$x${\tilde{G}}_2$x${\tilde{I}}_1$	[6,3,2,6,3,2,∞]	
19	${\tilde{A}}_3$x${\tilde{A}}_2$	[3^{[4]},2,3^{[3]}]	
20	${\tilde{B}}_3$x${\tilde{A}}_2$	[4,3^{1,1},2,3^{[3]}]	
21	${\tilde{C}}_3$x${\tilde{A}}_2$	[4,3,4,2,3^{[3]}]	
22	${\tilde{A}}_3$x${\tilde{B}}_2$	[3^{[4]},2,4,4]	
23	${\tilde{B}}_3$x${\tilde{B}}_2$	[4,3^{1,1},2,4,4]	
24	${\tilde{C}}_3$x${\tilde{B}}_2$	[4,3,4,2,4,4]	
25	${\tilde{A}}_3$x${\tilde{G}}_2$	[3^{[4]},2,6,3]	
26	${\tilde{B}}_3$x${\tilde{G}}_2$	[4,3^{1,1},2,6,3]	
27	${\tilde{C}}_3$x${\tilde{G}}_2$	[4,3,4,2,6,3]	

=== Regular and uniform hyperbolic honeycombs ===
There are no compact hyperbolic Coxeter groups of rank 6, groups that can generate honeycombs with all finite facets, and a finite vertex figure. However, there are 12 paracompact hyperbolic Coxeter groups of rank 6, each generating uniform honeycombs in 5-space as permutations of rings of the Coxeter diagrams.

Hyperbolic paracompact groups
${\bar{P}}_5$ = [3,3^{[5]}]: ${\widehat{AU}}_5$ = [(3,3,3,3,3,4)]: ${\widehat{AR}}_5$ = [(3,3,4,3,3,4)]:	${\bar{S}}_5$ = [4,3,3^{2,1}]: ${\bar{O}}_5$ = [3,4,3^{1,1}]: ${\bar{N}}_5$ = [3,(3,4)^{1,1}]:	${\bar{U}}_5$ = [3,3,3,4,3]: ${\bar{X}}_5$ = [3,3,4,3,3]: ${\bar{R}}_5$ = [3,4,3,3,4]:	${\bar{Q}}_5$ = [3^{2,1,1,1}]: ${\bar{M}}_5$ = [4,3,3^{1,1,1}]: ${\bar{L}}_5$ = [3^{1,1,1,1,1}]:

== Notes on the Wythoff construction for the uniform 6-polytopes ==
Construction of the reflective 6-dimensional uniform polytopes are done through a Wythoff construction process, and represented through a Coxeter–Dynkin diagram, where each node represents a mirror. Nodes are ringed to imply which mirrors are active. The full set of uniform polytopes generated are based on the unique permutations of ringed nodes. Uniform 6-polytopes are named in relation to the regular polytopes in each family. Some families have two regular constructors and thus may have two ways of naming them.

Here's the primary operators available for constructing and naming the uniform 6-polytopes.

The prismatic forms and bifurcating graphs can use the same truncation indexing notation, but require an explicit numbering system on the nodes for clarity.

Operation	Extended Schläfli symbol	Coxeter- Dynkin diagram	Description
Parent	t_{0}{p,q,r,s,t}		Any regular 6-polytope
Rectified	t_{1}{p,q,r,s,t}		The edges are fully truncated into single points. The 6-polytope now has the combined faces of the parent and dual.
Birectified	t_{2}{p,q,r,s,t}		Birectification reduces cells to their duals.
Truncated	t_{0,1}{p,q,r,s,t}		Each original vertex is cut off, with a new face filling the gap. Truncation has a degree of freedom, which has one solution that creates a uniform truncated 6-polytope. The 6-polytope has its original faces doubled in sides, and contains the faces of the dual.
Bitruncated	t_{1,2}{p,q,r,s,t}		Bitrunction transforms cells to their dual truncation.
Tritruncated	t_{2,3}{p,q,r,s,t}		Tritruncation transforms 4-faces to their dual truncation.
Cantellated	t_{0,2}{p,q,r,s,t}		In addition to vertex truncation, each original edge is beveled with new rectangular faces appearing in their place. A uniform cantellation is halfway between both the parent and dual forms.
Bicantellated	t_{1,3}{p,q,r,s,t}		In addition to vertex truncation, each original edge is beveled with new rectangular faces appearing in their place. A uniform cantellation is halfway between both the parent and dual forms.
Runcinated	t_{0,3}{p,q,r,s,t}		Runcination reduces cells and creates new cells at the vertices and edges.
Biruncinated	t_{1,4}{p,q,r,s,t}		Runcination reduces cells and creates new cells at the vertices and edges.
Stericated	t_{0,4}{p,q,r,s,t}		Sterication reduces 4-faces and creates new 4-faces at the vertices, edges, and faces in the gaps.
Pentellated	t_{0,5}{p,q,r,s,t}		Pentellation reduces 5-faces and creates new 5-faces at the vertices, edges, faces, and cells in the gaps. (expansion operation for polypeta)
Omnitruncated	t_{0,1,2,3,4,5}{p,q,r,s,t}		All five operators, truncation, cantellation, runcination, sterication, and pentellation are applied.

== See also ==
- List of regular polytopes § Higher dimensions

== Notes ==
Fundamental convex regular and uniform polytopes
Family	A_{n}	B_{n}	I_{2}(p) / D_{n}	E_{6} / E_{7} / E_{8} / F_{4} / G_{2}	H_{n}
Regular polygon	Triangle	Square	p-gon	Hexagon	Pentagon
Uniform polyhedron	Tetrahedron	Octahedron • Cube	Demicube		Dodecahedron • Icosahedron
Uniform polychoron	Pentachoron	16-cell • Tesseract	Demitesseract	24-cell	120-cell • 600-cell
Uniform 5-polytope	5-simplex	5-orthoplex • 5-cube	5-demicube		
Uniform 6-polytope	6-simplex	6-orthoplex • 6-cube	6-demicube	1_{22} • 2_{21}	
Uniform 7-polytope	7-simplex	7-orthoplex • 7-cube	7-demicube	1_{32} • 2_{31} • 3_{21}	
Uniform 8-polytope	8-simplex	8-orthoplex • 8-cube	8-demicube	1_{42} • 2_{41} • 4_{21}	
Uniform n-polytope	n-simplex	n-orthoplex • n-cube	n-demicube	1_{k2} • 2_{k1} • k_{21}	n-pentagonal polytope
Topics: Polytope families • Regular polytope • List of regular polytopes and compounds • Polytope operations

Fundamental convex regular and uniform honeycombs in dimensions 2–9
Space	Family	${\tilde{A}}_{n-1}$	${\tilde{C}}_{n-1}$	${\tilde{B}}_{n-1}$	${\tilde{D}}_{n-1}$	${\tilde{G}}_2$ / ${\tilde{F}}_4$ / ${\tilde{E}}_{n-1}$
E^{2}	Uniform tiling	0_{[3]}	δ_{3}	hδ_{3}	qδ_{3}	Hexagonal
E^{3}	Uniform convex honeycomb	0_{[4]}	δ_{4}	hδ_{4}	qδ_{4}	
E^{4}	Uniform 4-honeycomb	0_{[5]}	δ_{5}	hδ_{5}	qδ_{5}	24-cell honeycomb
E^{5}	Uniform 5-honeycomb	0_{[6]}	δ_{6}	hδ_{6}	qδ_{6}	
E^{6}	Uniform 6-honeycomb	0_{[7]}	δ_{7}	hδ_{7}	qδ_{7}	2_{22}
E^{7}	Uniform 7-honeycomb	0_{[8]}	δ_{8}	hδ_{8}	qδ_{8}	1_{33} • 3_{31}
E^{8}	Uniform 8-honeycomb	0_{[9]}	δ_{9}	hδ_{9}	qδ_{9}	1_{52} • 2_{51} • 5_{21}
E^{9}	Uniform 9-honeycomb	0_{[10]}	δ_{10}	hδ_{10}	qδ_{10}	
E^{10}	Uniform 10-honeycomb	0_{[11]}	δ_{11}	hδ_{11}	qδ_{11}	
E^{n−1}	Uniform (n−1)-honeycomb	0_{[n]}	δ_{n}	hδ_{n}	qδ_{n}	1_{k2} • 2_{k1} • k_{21}
