= Simple Lie group =

Connected non-abelian Lie group lacking nontrivial connected normal subgroups

In mathematics, a simple Lie group is a connected non-abelian Lie group G which does not have nontrivial connected normal subgroups. The list of simple Lie groups can be used to read off the list of simple Lie algebras and Riemannian symmetric spaces.

Together with the commutative Lie group of the real numbers, $\mathbb{R}$, and that of the unit-magnitude complex numbers, U(1) (the unit circle), simple Lie groups give the atomic "building blocks" that make up all (finite-dimensional) connected Lie groups via the operation of group extension. Many commonly encountered Lie groups are either simple or 'close' to being simple: for example, the so-called "special linear group" SL(n, $\mathbb{R}$) of n by n matrices with determinant equal to 1 is simple for all odd n > 1, when it is isomorphic to the projective special linear group.

The first classification of simple Lie groups was by Wilhelm Killing, and this work was later perfected by Élie Cartan. The final classification is often referred to as Killing-Cartan classification.

== Definition ==
Unfortunately, there is no universally accepted definition of a simple Lie group. In particular, it is not always defined as a Lie group that is simple as an abstract group. Authors differ on whether a simple Lie group has to be connected, or on whether it is allowed to have a non-trivial center, or on whether $\mathbb{R}$ is a simple Lie group.

The most common definition is that a Lie group is simple if it is connected, non-abelian, and every closed connected normal subgroup is either the identity or the whole group. In particular, simple groups are allowed to have a non-trivial center, but $\mathbb{R}$ is not simple.

In this article the connected simple Lie groups with trivial center are listed. Once these are known, the ones with non-trivial center are easy to list as follows. Any simple Lie group with trivial center has a universal cover whose center is the fundamental group of the simple Lie group. The corresponding simple Lie groups with non-trivial center can be obtained as quotients of this universal cover by a subgroup of the center.

=== Alternatives ===
An equivalent definition of a simple Lie group follows from the Lie correspondence: A connected Lie group is simple if its Lie algebra is simple. An important technical point is that a simple Lie group may contain discrete normal subgroups. For this reason, the definition of a simple Lie group is not equivalent to the definition of a Lie group that is simple as an abstract group.

Simple Lie groups include many classical Lie groups, which provide a group-theoretic underpinning for spherical geometry, projective geometry and related geometries in the sense of Felix Klein's Erlangen program. It emerged in the course of classification of simple Lie groups that there exist also several exceptional possibilities not corresponding to any familiar geometry. These exceptional groups account for many special examples and configurations in other branches of mathematics, as well as contemporary theoretical physics.

As a counterexample, the general linear group is neither simple, nor semisimple. This is because multiples of the identity form a nontrivial normal subgroup, thus evading the definition. Equivalently, the corresponding Lie algebra has a degenerate Killing form, because multiples of the identity map to the zero element of the algebra. Thus, the corresponding Lie algebra is also neither simple nor semisimple. Another counter-example are the special orthogonal groups in even dimension. These have the matrix $-I$ in the center, and this element is path-connected to the identity element, and so these groups evade the definition. Both of these are reductive groups.

== Related ideas ==
=== Semisimple Lie groups ===
A semisimple Lie group is a connected Lie group so that its only closed connected abelian normal subgroup is the trivial subgroup. Every simple Lie group is semisimple. More generally, any product of simple Lie groups is semisimple, and any quotient of a semisimple Lie group by a closed subgroup is semisimple. Every semisimple Lie group can be formed by taking a product of simple Lie groups and quotienting by a subgroup of its center. In other words, every semisimple Lie group is a central product of simple Lie groups. The semisimple Lie groups are exactly the Lie groups whose Lie algebras are semisimple Lie algebras.

=== Simple Lie algebras ===
The Lie algebra of a simple Lie group is a simple Lie algebra. This is a one-to-one correspondence between connected simple Lie groups with trivial center and simple Lie algebras of dimension greater than 1. (Authors differ on whether the one-dimensional Lie algebra should be counted as simple.)

Over the complex numbers the semisimple Lie algebras are classified by their Dynkin diagrams, of types "ABCDEFG". If L is a real simple Lie algebra, its complexification is a simple complex Lie algebra, unless L is already the complexification of a Lie algebra, in which case the complexification of L is a product of two copies of L. This reduces the problem of classifying the real simple Lie algebras to that of finding all the real forms of each complex simple Lie algebra (i.e., real Lie algebras whose complexification is the given complex Lie algebra). There are always at least 2 such forms: a split form and a compact form, and there are usually a few others. The different real forms correspond to the classes of automorphisms of order at most 2 of the complex Lie algebra.

=== Symmetric spaces ===
Symmetric spaces are classified as follows.

First, the universal cover of a symmetric space is still symmetric, so we can reduce to the case of simply connected symmetric spaces. (For example, the universal cover of a real projective plane is a sphere.)

Second, the product of symmetric spaces is symmetric, so we may as well just classify the irreducible simply connected ones (where irreducible means they cannot be written as a product of smaller symmetric spaces).

The irreducible simply connected symmetric spaces are the real line, and exactly two symmetric spaces corresponding to each non-compact simple Lie group G, one compact and one non-compact. The non-compact one is a cover of the quotient of G by a maximal compact subgroup H, and the compact one is a cover of the quotient of the compact form of G by the same subgroup H. This duality between compact and non-compact symmetric spaces is a generalization of the well known duality between spherical and hyperbolic geometry.

=== Hermitian symmetric spaces ===
A symmetric space with a compatible complex structure is called Hermitian. The compact simply connected irreducible Hermitian symmetric spaces fall into 4 infinite families with 2 exceptional ones left over, and each has a non-compact dual. In addition the complex plane is also a Hermitian symmetric space; this gives the complete list of irreducible Hermitian symmetric spaces.

The four families are the types A III, B I and D I for p = 2, D III, and C I, and the two exceptional ones are types E III and E VII of complex dimensions 16 and 27.

=== Notation ===
$\mathbb {R, C, H, O}$ stand for the real numbers, complex numbers, quaternions, and octonions.

In the symbols such as E_{6}^{−26} for the exceptional groups, the exponent −26 is the signature of an invariant symmetric bilinear form that is negative definite on the maximal compact subgroup. It is equal to the dimension of the group minus twice the dimension of a maximal compact subgroup.

The fundamental group listed in the table below is the fundamental group of the simple group with trivial center. Other simple groups with the same Lie algebra correspond to subgroups of this fundamental group (modulo the action of the outer automorphism group).

== Full classification ==
Simple Lie groups are fully classified. The classification is usually stated in several steps, namely:

- Classification of simple complex Lie algebras The classification of simple Lie algebras over the complex numbers by Dynkin diagrams.
- Classification of simple real Lie algebras Each simple complex Lie algebra has several real forms, classified by additional decorations of its Dynkin diagram called Satake diagrams, after Ichirô Satake.
- Classification of centerless simple Lie groups For every (real or complex) simple Lie algebra $\mathfrak{g}$, there is a unique "centerless" simple Lie group $G$ whose Lie algebra is $\mathfrak{g}$ and which has trivial center.
- Classification of simple Lie groups

One can show that the fundamental group of any Lie group is a discrete commutative group. Given a (nontrivial) subgroup $K\subset \pi_1(G)$ of the fundamental group of some Lie group $G$, one can use the theory of covering spaces to construct a new group $\tilde{G}^K$ with $K$ in its center. Now any (real or complex) Lie group can be obtained by applying this construction to centerless Lie groups. Note that real Lie groups obtained this way might not be real forms of any complex group. A very important example of such a real group is the metaplectic group, which appears in infinite-dimensional representation theory and physics. When one takes for $K\subset \pi_1(G)$ the full fundamental group, the resulting Lie group $\tilde{G}^{K = \pi_1(G)}$ is the universal cover of the centerless Lie group $G$, and is simply connected. In particular, every (real or complex) Lie algebra also corresponds to a unique connected and simply connected Lie group $\tilde{G}$ with that Lie algebra, called the "simply connected Lie group" associated to $\mathfrak{g}.$

=== Compact Lie groups ===
Every simple complex Lie algebra has a unique real form whose corresponding centerless Lie group is compact. It turns out that the simply connected Lie group in these cases is also compact. Compact Lie groups have a particularly tractable representation theory because of the Peter–Weyl theorem. Just like simple complex Lie algebras, centerless compact Lie groups are classified by Dynkin diagrams (first classified by Wilhelm Killing and Élie Cartan).

For the infinite (A, B, C, D) series of Dynkin diagrams, a connected compact Lie group associated to each Dynkin diagram can be explicitly described as a matrix group, with the corresponding centerless compact Lie group described as the quotient by a subgroup of scalar matrices. For those of type A and C we can find explicit matrix representations of the corresponding simply connected Lie group as matrix groups.

== Overview of the classification ==
A_{r} has as its associated simply connected compact group the special unitary group, SU(r + 1) and as its associated centerless compact group the projective unitary group PU(r + 1).

B_{r} has as its associated centerless compact groups the odd special orthogonal groups, SO(2r + 1). This group is not simply connected however: its universal (double) cover is the spin group.

C_{r} has as its associated simply connected group the group of unitary symplectic matrices, Sp(r) and as its associated centerless group the Lie group PSp(r) = Sp(r)/{I, −I} of projective unitary symplectic matrices. The symplectic groups have a double-cover by the metaplectic group.

D_{r} has as its associated compact group the even special orthogonal groups, SO(2r) and as its associated centerless compact group the projective special orthogonal group PSO(2r) = SO(2r)/{I, −I}. As with the B series, SO(2r) is not simply connected; its universal cover is again the spin group, but the latter again has a center (cf. its article).

The diagram D_{2} is two isolated nodes, the same as A_{1} ∪ A_{1}, and this coincidence corresponds to the covering map homomorphism from SU(2) × SU(2) to SO(4) given by quaternion multiplication; see quaternions and spatial rotation. Thus SO(4) is not a simple group. Also, the diagram D_{3} is the same as A_{3}, corresponding to a covering map homomorphism from SU(4) to SO(6).

In addition to the four families A_{i}, B_{i}, C_{i}, and D_{i} above, there are five so-called exceptional Dynkin diagrams G_{2}, F_{4}, E_{6}, E_{7}, and E_{8}; these exceptional Dynkin diagrams also have associated simply connected and centerless compact groups. However, the groups associated to the exceptional families are more difficult to describe than those associated to the infinite families, largely because their descriptions make use of exceptional objects. For example, the group associated to G_{2} is the automorphism group of the octonions, and the group associated to F_{4} is the automorphism group of a certain Albert algebra.

See also $\color{Blue} E_{7\frac 1 2}$.

== List ==
=== Abelian ===
	Dimension	Outer automorphism group	Dimension of symmetric space	Symmetric space	Remarks
$\mathbb{R}$ (Abelian)	1	$\mathbb{R}^*$	1	$\mathbb{R}$	^{†}

==== Notes ====
^† The group $\mathbb{R}$ is not 'simple' as an abstract group, and according to most (but not all) definitions this is not a simple Lie group. Further, most authors do not count its Lie algebra as a simple Lie algebra. It is listed here so that the list of "irreducible simply connected symmetric spaces" is complete. Note that $\mathbb{R}$ is the only such non-compact symmetric space without a compact dual (although it has a compact quotient S^{1}).

=== Compact ===
	Dimension	Real rank	Fundamental group	Outer automorphism group	Other names	Remarks
A_{n} (n ≥ 1) compact	n(n + 2)	0	Cyclic, order n + 1	1 if n = 1, 2 if n > 1.	projective special unitary group PSU(n + 1)	A_{1} is the same as B_{1} and C_{1}
B_{n} (n ≥ 2) compact	n(2n + 1)	0	2	1	special orthogonal group SO_{2n+1}(R)	B_{1} is the same as A_{1} and C_{1}. B_{2} is the same as C_{2}.
C_{n} (n ≥ 3) compact	n(2n + 1)	0	2	1	projective compact symplectic group PSp(n), PSp(2n), PUSp(n), PUSp(2n)	Hermitian. Complex structures of H^{n}. Copies of complex projective space in quaternionic projective space.
D_{n} (n ≥ 4) compact	n(2n − 1)	0	Order 4 (cyclic when n is odd).	2 if n > 4, S_{3} if n = 4	projective special orthogonal group PSO_{2n}(R)	D_{3} is the same as A_{3}, D_{2} is the same as A_{1}^{2}, and D_{1} is abelian.
E_{6}^{−78} compact	78	0	3	2		
E_{7}^{−133} compact	133	0	2	1		
E_{8}^{−248} compact	248	0	1	1		
F_{4}^{−52} compact	52	0	1	1		
G_{2}^{−14} compact	14	0	1	1		This is the automorphism group of the Cayley algebra.

=== Split ===
	Dimension	Real rank	Maximal compact subgroup	Fundamental group	Outer automorphism group	Other names	Dimension of symmetric space	Compact symmetric space	Non-Compact symmetric space	Remarks
A_{n} I (n ≥ 1) split	n(n + 2)	n	D_{n/2} or B_{(n−1)/2}	Infinite cyclic if n = 1; 2 if n ≥ 2	1 if n = 1; 2 if n ≥ 2.	projective special linear group PSL_{n+1}(R)	(n(n + 3))/2	Real structures on C^{n+1} or set of RP^{n} in CP^{n}. Hermitian if n = 1, in which case it is the 2-sphere.	Euclidean structures on R^{n+1}. Hermitian if n = 1, when it is the upper half plane or unit complex disc.	
B_{n} I (n ≥ 2) split	n(2n + 1)	n	SO(n)SO(n+1)	Non-cyclic, order 4	1	identity component of special orthogonal group SO(n,n+1)	n(n + 1)			B_{1} is the same as A_{1}.
C_{n} I (n ≥ 3) split	n(2n + 1)	n	A_{n−1}S^{1}	Infinite cyclic	1	projective symplectic group PSp_{2n}(R), PSp(2n,R), PSp(2n), PSp(n,R), PSp(n)	n(n + 1)	Hermitian. Complex structures of H^{n}. Copies of complex projective space in quaternionic projective space.	Hermitian. Complex structures on R^{2n} compatible with a symplectic form. Set of complex hyperbolic spaces in quaternionic hyperbolic space. Siegel upper half space.	C_{2} is the same as B_{2}, and C_{1} is the same as B_{1} and A_{1}.
D_{n} I (n ≥ 4) split	n(2n − 1)	n	SO(n)SO(n)	Order 4 if n odd, 8 if n even	2 if n > 4, S_{3} if n = 4	identity component of projective special orthogonal group PSO(n,n)	n^{2}			D_{3} is the same as A_{3}, D_{2} is the same as A_{1}^{2}, and D_{1} is abelian.
E_{6}^{6} I split	78	6	C_{4}	Order 2	Order 2	E I	42			
E_{7}^{7} V split	133	7	A_{7}	Cyclic, order 4	Order 2		70			
E_{8}^{8} VIII split	248	8	D_{8}	2	1	E VIII	128			@ E8
F_{4}^{4} I split	52	4	C_{3} × A_{1}	Order 2	1	F I	28	Quaternionic projective planes in Cayley projective plane.	Hyperbolic quaternionic projective planes in hyperbolic Cayley projective plane.	
G_{2}^{2} I split	14	2	A_{1} × A_{1}	Order 2	1	G I	8	Quaternionic subalgebras of the Cayley algebra. Quaternion-Kähler.	Non-division quaternionic subalgebras of the non-division Cayley algebra. Quaternion-Kähler.	

=== Complex ===
	Real dimension	Real rank	Maximal compact subgroup	Fundamental group	Outer automorphism group	Other names	Dimension of symmetric space	Compact symmetric space	Non-Compact symmetric space
A_{n} (n ≥ 1) complex	2n(n + 2)	n	A_{n}	Cyclic, order n + 1	2 if n = 1, 4 (noncyclic) if n ≥ 2.	projective complex special linear group PSL_{n+1}(C)	n(n + 2)	Compact group A_{n}	Hermitian forms on C^{n+1} with fixed volume.
B_{n} (n ≥ 2) complex	2n(2n + 1)	n	B_{n}	2	Order 2 (complex conjugation)	complex special orthogonal group SO_{2n+1}(C)	n(2n + 1)	Compact group B_{n}	
C_{n} (n ≥ 3) complex	2n(2n + 1)	n	C_{n}	2	Order 2 (complex conjugation)	projective complex symplectic group PSp_{2n}(C)	n(2n + 1)	Compact group C_{n}	
D_{n} (n ≥ 4) complex	2n(2n − 1)	n	D_{n}	Order 4 (cyclic when n is odd)	Noncyclic of order 4 for n > 4, or the product of a group of order 2 and the symmetric group S_{3} when n = 4.	projective complex special orthogonal group PSO_{2n}(C)	n(2n − 1)	Compact group D_{n}	
E_{6} complex	156	6	E_{6}	3	Order 4 (non-cyclic)		78	Compact group E_{6}	
E_{7} complex	266	7	E_{7}	2	Order 2 (complex conjugation)		133	Compact group E_{7}	
E_{8} complex	496	8	E_{8}	1	Order 2 (complex conjugation)		248	Compact group E_{8}	
F_{4} complex	104	4	F_{4}	1	2		52	Compact group F_{4}	
G_{2} complex	28	2	G_{2}	1	Order 2 (complex conjugation)		14	Compact group G_{2}	

=== Others ===
	Dimension	Real rank	Maximal compact subgroup	Fundamental group	Outer automorphism group	Other names	Dimension of symmetric space	Compact symmetric space	Non-Compact symmetric space	Remarks
A_{2n−1} II (n ≥ 2)	(2n − 1)(2n + 1)	n − 1	C_{n}	Order 2		SL_{n}(H), SU^{∗}(2n)	(n − 1)(2n + 1)	Quaternionic structures on C^{2n} compatible with the Hermitian structure	Copies of quaternionic hyperbolic space (of dimension n − 1) in complex hyperbolic space (of dimension 2n − 1).	
A_{n} III (n ≥ 1) p + q = n + 1 (1 ≤ p ≤ q)	n(n + 2)	p	A_{p−1}A_{q−1}S^{1}			SU(p,q), A III	2pq	Hermitian. Grassmannian of p subspaces of C^{p+q}. If p or q is 2; quaternion-Kähler	Hermitian. Grassmannian of maximal positive definite subspaces of C^{p,q}. If p or q is 2, quaternion-Kähler	If p=q=1, split If |p−q| ≤ 1, quasi-split
B_{n} I (n > 1) p+q = 2n+1	n(2n + 1)	min(p,q)	SO(p)SO(q)			SO(p,q)	pq	Grassmannian of R^{p}s in R^{p+q}. If p or q is 1, Projective space If p or q is 2; Hermitian; If p or q is 4, quaternion-Kähler	Grassmannian of positive definite R^{p}s in R^{p,q}. If p or q is 1, Hyperbolic space If p or q is 2, Hermitian; If p or q is 4, quaternion-Kähler	If |p−q| ≤ 1, split.
C_{n} II (n > 2) n = p+q (1 ≤ p ≤ q)	n(2n + 1)	min(p,q)	C_{p}C_{q}	Order 2	1 if p ≠ q, 2 if p = q.	Sp_{2p,2q}(R)	4pq	Grassmannian of H^{p}s in H^{p+q}. If p or q is 1, quaternionic projective space in which case it is quaternion-Kähler.	H^{p}s in H^{p,q}. If p or q is 1, quaternionic hyperbolic space in which case it is quaternion-Kähler.	
D_{n} I (n ≥ 4) p+q = 2n	n(2n − 1)	min(p,q)	SO(p)SO(q)		If p and q ≥ 3, order 8.	SO(p,q)	pq	Grassmannian of R^{p}s in R^{p+q}. If p or q is 1, Projective space If p or q is 2 ; Hermitian; If p or q is 4, quaternion-Kähler	Grassmannian of positive definite R^{p}s in R^{p,q}. If p or q is 1, Hyperbolic Space; If p or q is 2, Hermitian; If p or q is 4, quaternion-Kähler	If p = q, split If |p−q| ≤ 2, quasi-split
D_{n} III (n ≥ 4)	n(2n − 1)	⌊n/2⌋	A_{n−1}R^{1}	Infinite cyclic	Order 2	SO^{*}(2n)	n(n − 1)	Hermitian. Complex structures on R^{2n} compatible with the Euclidean structure.	Hermitian. Quaternionic quadratic forms on R^{2n}.	
E_{6}^{2} II (quasi-split)	78	4	A_{5}A_{1}	Cyclic, order 6	Order 2	E II	40	Quaternion-Kähler.	Quaternion-Kähler.	Quasi-split but not split.
E_{6}^{−14} III	78	2	D_{5}S^{1}	Infinite cyclic	Trivial	E III	32	Hermitian. Rosenfeld elliptic projective plane over the complexified Cayley numbers.	Hermitian. Rosenfeld hyperbolic projective plane over the complexified Cayley numbers.	
E_{6}^{−26} IV	78	2	F_{4}	Trivial	Order 2	E IV	26	Set of Cayley projective planes in the projective plane over the complexified Cayley numbers.	Set of Cayley hyperbolic planes in the hyperbolic plane over the complexified Cayley numbers.	
E_{7}^{−5} VI	133	4	D_{6}A_{1}	Non-cyclic, order 4	Trivial	E VI	64	Quaternion-Kähler.	Quaternion-Kähler.	
E_{7}^{−25} VII	133	3	E_{6}S^{1}	Infinite cyclic	Order 2	E VII	54	Hermitian.	Hermitian.	
E_{8}^{−24} IX	248	4	E_{7} × A_{1}	Order 2	1	E IX	112	Quaternion-Kähler.	Quaternion-Kähler.	
F_{4}^{−20} II	52	1	B_{4} (Spin_{9}(R))	Order 2	1	F II	16	Cayley projective plane. Quaternion-Kähler.	Hyperbolic Cayley projective plane. Quaternion-Kähler.	

== Simple Lie groups of small dimension ==
The following table lists some Lie groups with simple Lie algebras of small dimension. The groups on a given line all have the same Lie algebra. In the dimension 1 case, the groups are abelian and not simple.

Dim	Groups		Symmetric space	Compact dual	Rank	Dim
1	ℝ, S^{1} = U(1) = SO_{2}(ℝ) = Spin(2)	Abelian, Compact	Real line		0	1
3	S^{3} = Sp(1) = SU(2)=Spin(3), SO_{3}(ℝ) = PSU(2)	Compact				
3	SL_{2}(ℝ) = Sp_{2}(ℝ), SO_{2,1}(ℝ)	Split, Hermitian, hyperbolic	Hyperbolic plane $\mathbb{H}^2$	Sphere S^{2}	1	2
6	SL_{2}(ℂ) = Sp_{2}(ℂ), SO_{3,1}(ℝ), SO_{3}(ℂ)	Complex	Hyperbolic space $\mathbb{H}^3$	Sphere S^{3}	1	3
8	SL_{3}(ℝ)	Split	Euclidean structures on $\mathbb{R}^3$	Real structures on $\mathbb{C}^3$	2	5
8	SU(3)	Compact				
8	SU(1,2)	Hermitian, quasi-split, quaternionic	Complex hyperbolic plane	Complex projective plane	1	4
10	Sp(2) = Spin(5), SO_{5}(ℝ)	Compact				
10	SO_{4,1}(ℝ), Sp_{2,2}(ℝ)	Hyperbolic, quaternionic	Hyperbolic space $\mathbb{H}^4$	Sphere S^{4}	1	4
10	SO_{3,2}(ℝ), Sp_{4}(ℝ)	Split, Hermitian	Siegel upper half space	Complex structures on $\mathbb{H}^2$	2	6
14	G_{2}	Compact				
14	G_{2}	Split, quaternionic	Non-division quaternionic subalgebras of non-division octonions	Quaternionic subalgebras of octonions	2	8
15	SU(4) = Spin(6), SO_{6}(ℝ)	Compact				
15	SL_{4}(ℝ), SO_{3,3}(ℝ)	Split	ℝ^{3} in ℝ^{3,3}	Grassmannian G(3,3)	3	9
15	SU(3,1), SO*(6)	Hermitian	Complex hyperbolic space	Complex projective space	1	6
15	SU(2,2), SO_{4,2}(ℝ)	Hermitian, quasi-split, quaternionic	ℝ^{2} in ℝ^{2,4}	Grassmannian G(2,4)	2	8
15	SL_{2}(ℍ), SO_{5,1}(ℝ)	Hyperbolic	Hyperbolic space $\mathbb{H}^5$	Sphere S^{5}	1	5
16	SL_{3}(ℂ)	Complex		SU(3)	2	8
20	SO_{5}(ℂ), Sp_{4}(ℂ)	Complex		Spin_{5}(ℝ)	2	10
21	SO_{7}(ℝ)	Compact				
21	SO_{6,1}(ℝ)	Hyperbolic	Hyperbolic space $\mathbb{H}^6$	Sphere S^{6}		
21	SO_{5,2}(ℝ)	Hermitian				
21	SO_{4,3}(ℝ)	Split, quaternionic				
21	Sp(3)	Compact				
21	Sp_{6}(ℝ)	Split, hermitian				
21	Sp_{4,2}(ℝ)	Quaternionic				
24	SU(5)	Compact				
24	SL_{5}(ℝ)	Split				
24	SU_{4,1}	Hermitian				
24	SU_{3,2}	Hermitian, quaternionic				
28	SO_{8}(ℝ)	Compact				
28	SO_{7,1}(ℝ)	Hyperbolic	Hyperbolic space $\mathbb{H}^7$	Sphere S^{7}		
28	SO_{6,2}(ℝ), SO^{∗}_{8}(ℝ)	Hermitian				
28	SO_{5,3}(ℝ)	Quasi-split				
28	SO_{4,4}(ℝ)	Split, quaternionic				
28	G_{2}(ℂ)	Complex				
30	SL_{4}(ℂ)	Complex				

== Simply laced groups ==
A simply laced group is a Lie group whose Dynkin diagram only contain simple links, and therefore all the nonzero roots of the corresponding Lie algebra have the same length. The A, D and E series groups are all simply laced, but no group of type B, C, F, or G is simply laced.

== See also ==
- Cartan matrix
- Coxeter matrix
- Weyl group
- Coxeter group
- Kac–Moody algebra
- Catastrophe theory
- Table of Lie groups
- Classification of low-dimensional real Lie algebras
- Classification of finite simple groups
