= D5 polytope =

Orthographic projections in the D_{5} Coxeter plane
5-demicube	5-orthoplex

In 5-dimensional geometry, there are 23 uniform polytopes with D_{5} symmetry, 8 are unique, and 15 are shared with the B_{5} symmetry. There are two special forms, the 5-orthoplex, and 5-demicube with 10 and 16 vertices respectively.

They can be visualized as symmetric orthographic projections in Coxeter planes of the D_{5} Coxeter group, and other subgroups.

== Graphs ==
Symmetric orthographic projections of these 8 polytopes can be made in the D_{5}, D_{4}, D_{3}, A_{3}, Coxeter planes. A_{k} has [k+1] symmetry, D_{k} has [2(k-1)] symmetry. The B_{5} plane is included, with only half the [10] symmetry displayed.

These 8 polytopes are each shown in these 5 symmetry planes, with vertices and edges drawn, and vertices colored by the number of overlapping vertices in each projective position.

#	Coxeter plane projections					Coxeter diagram = Schläfli symbol Johnson and Bowers names
#	[10/2]	[8]	[6]	[4]	[4]	Coxeter diagram = Schläfli symbol Johnson and Bowers names
#	B_{5}	D_{5}	D_{4}	D_{3}	A_{3}	Coxeter diagram = Schläfli symbol Johnson and Bowers names
1						= h{4,3,3,3} 5-demicube Hemipenteract (hin)
2						= h_{2}{4,3,3,3} Cantic 5-cube Truncated hemipenteract (thin)
3						= h_{3}{4,3,3,3} Runcic 5-cube Small rhombated hemipenteract (sirhin)
4						= h_{4}{4,3,3,3} Steric 5-cube Small prismated hemipenteract (siphin)
5						= h_{2,3}{4,3,3,3} Runcicantic 5-cube Great rhombated hemipenteract (girhin)
6						= h_{2,4}{4,3,3,3} Stericantic 5-cube Prismatotruncated hemipenteract (pithin)
7						= h_{3,4}{4,3,3,3} Steriruncic 5-cube Prismatorhombated hemipenteract (pirhin)
8						= h_{2,3,4}{4,3,3,3} Steriruncicantic 5-cube Great prismated hemipenteract (giphin)

Fundamental convex regular and uniform polytopes in dimensions 2–10
Family	A_{n}	B_{n}	I_{2}(p) / D_{n}	E_{6} / E_{7} / E_{8} / F_{4} / G_{2}	H_{n}
Regular polygon	Triangle	Square	p-gon	Hexagon	Pentagon
Uniform polyhedron	Tetrahedron	Octahedron • Cube	Demicube		Dodecahedron • Icosahedron
Uniform polychoron	Pentachoron	16-cell • Tesseract	Demitesseract	24-cell	120-cell • 600-cell
Uniform 5-polytope	5-simplex	5-orthoplex • 5-cube	5-demicube		
Uniform 6-polytope	6-simplex	6-orthoplex • 6-cube	6-demicube	1_{22} • 2_{21}	
Uniform 7-polytope	7-simplex	7-orthoplex • 7-cube	7-demicube	1_{32} • 2_{31} • 3_{21}	
Uniform 8-polytope	8-simplex	8-orthoplex • 8-cube	8-demicube	1_{42} • 2_{41} • 4_{21}	
Uniform 9-polytope	9-simplex	9-orthoplex • 9-cube	9-demicube		
Uniform 10-polytope	10-simplex	10-orthoplex • 10-cube	10-demicube		
Uniform n-polytope	n-simplex	n-orthoplex • n-cube	n-demicube	1_{k2} • 2_{k1} • k_{21}	n-pentagonal polytope
Topics: Polytope families • Regular polytope • List of regular polytopes and compounds • Polytope operations
