= Octacube =

Octacube may refer to:

- 24-cell or octacube, a 4-dimensional figure
- Octacube (sculpture), a large steel sculpture of an octacube
- Eight cubes as the polyhedron net of a hypercube used in Dali's Crucifixion (Corpus Hypercubus)
