= Steric 5-cubes =

5-cube	Steric 5-cube	Stericantic 5-cube
Half 5-cube	Steriruncic 5-cube	Steriruncicantic 5-cube
Orthogonal projections in B_{5} Coxeter plane

In five-dimensional geometry, a steric 5-cube, steric 5-demicube or sterihalf 5-cube, is a convex uniform 5-polytope. There are unique 4 steric forms of the 5-cube. Steric 5-cubes have half the vertices of stericated 5-cubes.

== Steric 5-cube ==
Steric 5-cube
Type	uniform polyteron
Schläfli symbol	t_{0,3}{3,3^{2,1}}; h_{4}{4,3,3,3}
Coxeter-Dynkin diagram	
4-faces	82
Cells	480
Faces	720
Edges	400
Vertices	80
Vertex figure	{3,3}-t_{1}{3,3} antiprism
Coxeter groups	D_{5}, [3^{2,1,1}]
Properties	convex

=== Alternate names ===
- Steric penteract, runcinated demipenteract
- Small prismated hemipenteract (siphin) (Jonathan Bowers)

=== Cartesian coordinates ===
The Cartesian coordinates for the 80 vertices of a steric 5-cube centered at the origin are the permutations of

(±1,±1,±1,±1,±3)

with an odd number of plus signs.

=== Images ===
Orthographic projections
Coxeter plane	B_{5}	
Graph		
Dihedral symmetry	[10/2]	
Coxeter plane	D_{5}	D_{4}
Graph		
Dihedral symmetry	[8]	[6]
Coxeter plane	D_{3}	A_{3}
Graph		
Dihedral symmetry	[4]	[4]

=== Related polytopes ===
Dimensional family of steric n-cubes
n	5	6	7	8
[1^{+},4,3^{n − 2}] = [3,3^{n − 3,1}]	[1^{+},4,3^{3}] = [3,3^{2,1}]	[1^{+},4,3^{4}] = [3,3^{3,1}]	[1^{+},4,3^{5}] = [3,3^{4,1}]	[1^{+},4,3^{6}] = [3,3^{5,1}]
Steric figure				
Coxeter	=	=	=	=
Schläfli	h_{4}{4,3^{3}}	h_{4}{4,3^{4}}	h_{4}{4,3^{5}}	h_{4}{4,3^{6}}

== Stericantic 5-cube ==
Stericantic 5-cube
Type	uniform polyteron
Schläfli symbol	t_{0,1,3}{3,3^{2,1}}; h_{2,4}{4,3,3,3}
Coxeter-Dynkin diagram	
4-faces	82
Cells	720
Faces	1840
Edges	1680
Vertices	480
Vertex figure	
Coxeter groups	D_{5}, [3^{2,1,1}]
Properties	convex

=== Alternate names ===
- Prismatotruncated hemipenteract (pithin) (Jonathan Bowers)

=== Cartesian coordinates ===
The Cartesian coordinates for the 480 vertices of a stericantic 5-cube centered at the origin are coordinate permutations:

(±1,±1,±3,±3,±5)

with an odd number of plus signs.

=== Images ===
Orthographic projections
Coxeter plane	B_{5}	
Graph		
Dihedral symmetry	[10/2]	
Coxeter plane	D_{5}	D_{4}
Graph		
Dihedral symmetry	[8]	[6]
Coxeter plane	D_{3}	A_{3}
Graph		
Dihedral symmetry	[4]	[4]

== Steriruncic 5-cube ==
Steriruncic 5-cube
Type	uniform polyteron
Schläfli symbol	t_{0,2,3}{3,3^{2,1}}; h_{3,4}{4,3,3,3}
Coxeter-Dynkin diagram	
4-faces	82
Cells	560
Faces	1280
Edges	1120
Vertices	320
Vertex figure	
Coxeter groups	D_{5}, [3^{2,1,1}]
Properties	convex

=== Alternate names ===
- Prismatorhombated hemipenteract (pirhin) (Jonathan Bowers)

=== Cartesian coordinates ===
The Cartesian coordinates for the 320 vertices of a steriruncic 5-cube centered at the origin are coordinate permutations:

(±1,±1,±1,±3,±5)

with an odd number of plus signs.

=== Images ===
Orthographic projections
Coxeter plane	B_{5}	
Graph		
Dihedral symmetry	[10/2]	
Coxeter plane	D_{5}	D_{4}
Graph		
Dihedral symmetry	[8]	[6]
Coxeter plane	D_{3}	A_{3}
Graph		
Dihedral symmetry	[4]	[4]

== Steriruncicantic 5-cube ==
Steriruncicantic 5-cube
Type	uniform polyteron
Schläfli symbol	t_{0,1,2,3}{3,3^{2,1}}; h_{2,3,4}{4,3,3,3}
Coxeter-Dynkin diagram	
4-faces	82
Cells	720
Faces	2080
Edges	2400
Vertices	960
Vertex figure	
Coxeter groups	D_{5}, [3^{2,1,1}]
Properties	convex

=== Alternate names ===
- Great prismated hemipenteract (giphin) (Jonathan Bowers)

=== Cartesian coordinates ===
The Cartesian coordinates for the 960 vertices of a steriruncicantic 5-cube centered at the origin are coordinate permutations:

(±1,±1,±3,±5,±7)

with an odd number of plus signs.

=== Images ===
Orthographic projections
Coxeter plane	B_{5}	
Graph		
Dihedral symmetry	[10/2]	
Coxeter plane	D_{5}	D_{4}
Graph		
Dihedral symmetry	[8]	[6]
Coxeter plane	D_{3}	A_{3}
Graph		
Dihedral symmetry	[4]	[4]

== Related polytopes ==
These polytopes are based on the 5-demicube, a member of a dimensional family of uniform polytopes called demihypercubes for being alternation of the hypercube family.

There are 23 uniform polytera (uniform 5-polytopes) that can be constructed from the D_{5} symmetry of the 5-demicube, 8 of which are unique to this family, and 15 are shared within the 5-cube family.

D5 polytopes
h{4,3,3,3}	h_{2}{4,3,3,3}	h_{3}{4,3,3,3}	h_{4}{4,3,3,3}	h_{2,3}{4,3,3,3}	h_{2,4}{4,3,3,3}	h_{3,4}{4,3,3,3}	h_{2,3,4}{4,3,3,3}

Fundamental convex regular and uniform polytopes in dimensions 2–10
Family	A_{n}	B_{n}	I_{2}(p) / D_{n}	E_{6} / E_{7} / E_{8} / F_{4} / G_{2}	H_{n}
Regular polygon	Triangle	Square	p-gon	Hexagon	Pentagon
Uniform polyhedron	Tetrahedron	Octahedron • Cube	Demicube		Dodecahedron • Icosahedron
Uniform polychoron	Pentachoron	16-cell • Tesseract	Demitesseract	24-cell	120-cell • 600-cell
Uniform 5-polytope	5-simplex	5-orthoplex • 5-cube	5-demicube		
Uniform 6-polytope	6-simplex	6-orthoplex • 6-cube	6-demicube	1_{22} • 2_{21}	
Uniform 7-polytope	7-simplex	7-orthoplex • 7-cube	7-demicube	1_{32} • 2_{31} • 3_{21}	
Uniform 8-polytope	8-simplex	8-orthoplex • 8-cube	8-demicube	1_{42} • 2_{41} • 4_{21}	
Uniform 9-polytope	9-simplex	9-orthoplex • 9-cube	9-demicube		
Uniform 10-polytope	10-simplex	10-orthoplex • 10-cube	10-demicube		
Uniform n-polytope	n-simplex	n-orthoplex • n-cube	n-demicube	1_{k2} • 2_{k1} • k_{21}	n-pentagonal polytope
Topics: Polytope families • Regular polytope • List of regular polytopes and compounds • Polytope operations
