= Runcic 5-cubes =

Concept in geometry

5-cube	Runcic 5-cube =
5-demicube =	Runcicantic 5-cube =
Orthogonal projections in B_{5} Coxeter plane

In five-dimensional geometry, a runcic 5-cube, runcic 5-demicube or runcihalf 5-cube, is a convex uniform 5-polytope. There are 2 runcic forms for the 5-cube. Runcic 5-cubes have half the vertices of runcinated 5-cubes.

== Runcic 5-cube ==
Runcic 5-cube
Type	uniform 5-polytope
Schläfli symbol	h_{3}{4,3,3,3}
Coxeter-Dynkin diagram	
4-faces	42
Cells	360
Faces	880
Edges	720
Vertices	160
Vertex figure	
Coxeter groups	D_{5}, [3^{2,1,1}]
Properties	convex

=== Alternate names ===
- Cantellated 5-demicube/demipenteract
- Small rhombated hemipenteract (sirhin) (Jonathan Bowers)

=== Cartesian coordinates ===
The Cartesian coordinates for the 960 vertices of a runcic 5-cubes centered at the origin are coordinate permutations:

(±1,±1,±1,±3,±3)

with an odd number of plus signs.

=== Images ===
Orthographic projections
Coxeter plane	B_{5}	
Graph		
Dihedral symmetry	[10/2]	
Coxeter plane	D_{5}	D_{4}
Graph		
Dihedral symmetry	[8]	[6]
Coxeter plane	D_{3}	A_{3}
Graph		
Dihedral symmetry	[4]	[4]

=== Related polytopes ===
It has half the vertices of the runcinated 5-cube, as compared here in the B5 Coxeter plane projections:

Runcic 5-cube	Runcinated 5-cube

Runcic n-cubes
n	4	5	6	7	8
[1^{+},4,3^{n − 2}] = [3,3^{n − 3,1}]	[1^{+},4,3^{2}] = [3,3^{1,1}]	[1^{+},4,3^{3}] = [3,3^{2,1}]	[1^{+},4,3^{4}] = [3,3^{3,1}]	[1^{+},4,3^{5}] = [3,3^{4,1}]	[1^{+},4,3^{6}] = [3,3^{5,1}]
Runcic figure					
Coxeter	=	=	=	=	=
Schläfli	h_{3}{4,3^{2}}	h_{3}{4,3^{3}}	h_{3}{4,3^{4}}	h_{3}{4,3^{5}}	h_{3}{4,3^{6}}

== Runcicantic 5-cube ==
Runcicantic 5-cube
Type	uniform 5-polytope
Schläfli symbol	t_{0,1,2}{3,3^{2,1}} h_{2,3}{4,3^{3}}
Coxeter-Dynkin diagram	
4-faces	42
Cells	360
Faces	1040
Edges	1200
Vertices	480
Vertex figure	
Coxeter groups	D_{5}, [3^{2,1,1}]
Properties	convex

=== Alternate names ===
- Cantitruncated 5-demicube/demipenteract
- Great rhombated hemipenteract (girhin) (Jonathan Bowers)

=== Cartesian coordinates ===
The Cartesian coordinates for the 480 vertices of a runcicantic 5-cube centered at the origin are coordinate permutations:

(±1,±1,±3,±5,±5)

with an odd number of plus signs.

=== Images ===
Orthographic projections
Coxeter plane	B_{5}	
Graph		
Dihedral symmetry	[10/2]	
Coxeter plane	D_{5}	D_{4}
Graph		
Dihedral symmetry	[8]	[6]
Coxeter plane	D_{3}	A_{3}
Graph		
Dihedral symmetry	[4]	[4]

=== Related polytopes ===
It has half the vertices of the runcicantellated 5-cube, as compared here in the B5 Coxeter plane projections:

Runcicantic 5-cube	Runcicantellated 5-cube

== Related polytopes ==
These polytopes are based on the 5-demicube, a member of a dimensional family of uniform polytopes called demihypercubes for being alternation of the hypercube family.

There are 23 uniform 5-polytopes that can be constructed from the D_{5} symmetry of the 5-demicube, of which are unique to this family, and 15 are shared within the 5-cube family.

D5 polytopes
h{4,3,3,3}	h_{2}{4,3,3,3}	h_{3}{4,3,3,3}	h_{4}{4,3,3,3}	h_{2,3}{4,3,3,3}	h_{2,4}{4,3,3,3}	h_{3,4}{4,3,3,3}	h_{2,3,4}{4,3,3,3}

== Notes ==
Fundamental convex regular and uniform polytopes in dimensions 2–10
Family	A_{n}	B_{n}	I_{2}(p) / D_{n}	E_{6} / E_{7} / E_{8} / F_{4} / G_{2}	H_{n}
Regular polygon	Triangle	Square	p-gon	Hexagon	Pentagon
Uniform polyhedron	Tetrahedron	Octahedron • Cube	Demicube		Dodecahedron • Icosahedron
Uniform polychoron	Pentachoron	16-cell • Tesseract	Demitesseract	24-cell	120-cell • 600-cell
Uniform 5-polytope	5-simplex	5-orthoplex • 5-cube	5-demicube		
Uniform 6-polytope	6-simplex	6-orthoplex • 6-cube	6-demicube	1_{22} • 2_{21}	
Uniform 7-polytope	7-simplex	7-orthoplex • 7-cube	7-demicube	1_{32} • 2_{31} • 3_{21}	
Uniform 8-polytope	8-simplex	8-orthoplex • 8-cube	8-demicube	1_{42} • 2_{41} • 4_{21}	
Uniform 9-polytope	9-simplex	9-orthoplex • 9-cube	9-demicube		
Uniform 10-polytope	10-simplex	10-orthoplex • 10-cube	10-demicube		
Uniform n-polytope	n-simplex	n-orthoplex • n-cube	n-demicube	1_{k2} • 2_{k1} • k_{21}	n-pentagonal polytope
Topics: Polytope families • Regular polytope • List of regular polytopes and compounds • Polytope operations
