= Cantic n-cube =

Uniform n-polytope; AKA truncated n-demicube

In geometry of n dimensions or higher, a cantic n-cube, cantihalf n-cube, or truncated n-demicube is a uniform n-polytope, being a truncation of the n-demicube. It has half the vertices of a cantellated n-dimensional hypercube. It is a convex polytope.

Here are some examples:

Dimensional family of cantic n-cubes
n	3	4	5	6	7	8
Symmetry [1^{+},4,3^{n-2}]	[1^{+},4,3] = [3,3]	[1^{+},4,3^{2}] = [3,3^{1,1}]	[1^{+},4,3^{3}] = [3,3^{2,1}]	[1^{+},4,3^{4}] = [3,3^{3,1}]	[1^{+},4,3^{5}] = [3,3^{4,1}]	[1^{+},4,3^{6}] = [3,3^{5,1}]
Cantic figure						
Coxeter	=	=	=	=	=	=
Schläfli	h_{2}{4,3}	h_{2}{4,3^{2}}	h_{2}{4,3^{3}}	h_{2}{4,3^{4}}	h_{2}{4,3^{5}}	h_{2}{4,3^{6}}

== Cartesian coordinates ==
The Cartesian coordinates for the vertices of a cantic n-cube centered at the origin and edge length 6√2 are coordinate permutations, where two dimensions have ±1, and the remaining n − 2 have ±3, with an odd number of plus signs overall.

== Specific cases ==
=== Cantic 5-cube ===
D5 Coxeter plane projection
Schläfli symbol	h_{2}{4,3,3,3} t{3,3^{2,1}}
Coxeter-Dynkin diagram	=
4-faces	42 total: 16 r{3,3,3} 16 t{3,3,3} 10 t{3,3,4}
Cells	280 total: 80 {3,3} 120 t{3,3} 80 {3,4}
Faces	640 total: 480 {3} 160 {6}
Edges	560
Vertices	160
Vertex figure	( )v{ }×{3}
Coxeter groups	D_{5}, [3^{2,1,1}]

The cantic 5-cube is sometimes referred to as thin, short for truncated hemipenteract.

Orthographic projections
Coxeter plane	B_{5}	
Graph		
Dihedral symmetry	[10/2]	
Coxeter plane	D_{5}	D_{4}
Graph		
Dihedral symmetry	[8]	[6]
Coxeter plane	D_{3}	A_{3}
Graph		
Dihedral symmetry	[4]	[4]

=== Cantic 6-cube ===
D6 Coxeter plane projection
Schläfli symbol	t_{0,1}{3,3^{3,1}} h_{2}{4,3^{4}}
Coxeter-Dynkin diagram	=
5-faces	76
4-faces	636
Cells	2080
Faces	3200
Edges	2160
Vertices	480
Vertex figure	( )v[{ }x{3,3}]
Coxeter groups	D_{6}, [3^{3,1,1}]

The cantic 6-cube is sometimes referred to as thax, short for truncated hemihexeract.

Orthographic projections
Coxeter plane	B_{6}	
Graph		
Dihedral symmetry	[12/2]	
Coxeter plane	D_{6}	D_{5}
Graph		
Dihedral symmetry	[10]	[8]
Coxeter plane	D_{4}	D_{3}
Graph		
Dihedral symmetry	[6]	[4]
Coxeter plane	A_{5}	A_{3}
Graph		
Dihedral symmetry	[6]	[4]

Fundamental convex regular and uniform polytopes
Family	A_{n}	B_{n}	I_{2}(p) / D_{n}	E_{6} / E_{7} / E_{8} / F_{4} / G_{2}	H_{n}
Regular polygon	Triangle	Square	p-gon	Hexagon	Pentagon
Uniform polyhedron	Tetrahedron	Octahedron • Cube	Demicube		Dodecahedron • Icosahedron
Uniform polychoron	Pentachoron	16-cell • Tesseract	Demitesseract	24-cell	120-cell • 600-cell
Uniform 5-polytope	5-simplex	5-orthoplex • 5-cube	5-demicube		
Uniform 6-polytope	6-simplex	6-orthoplex • 6-cube	6-demicube	1_{22} • 2_{21}	
Uniform 7-polytope	7-simplex	7-orthoplex • 7-cube	7-demicube	1_{32} • 2_{31} • 3_{21}	
Uniform 8-polytope	8-simplex	8-orthoplex • 8-cube	8-demicube	1_{42} • 2_{41} • 4_{21}	
Uniform n-polytope	n-simplex	n-orthoplex • n-cube	n-demicube	1_{k2} • 2_{k1} • k_{21}	n-pentagonal polytope
Topics: Polytope families • Regular polytope • List of regular polytopes and compounds • Polytope operations
