= 24-cell =

Regular object in four dimensional geometry

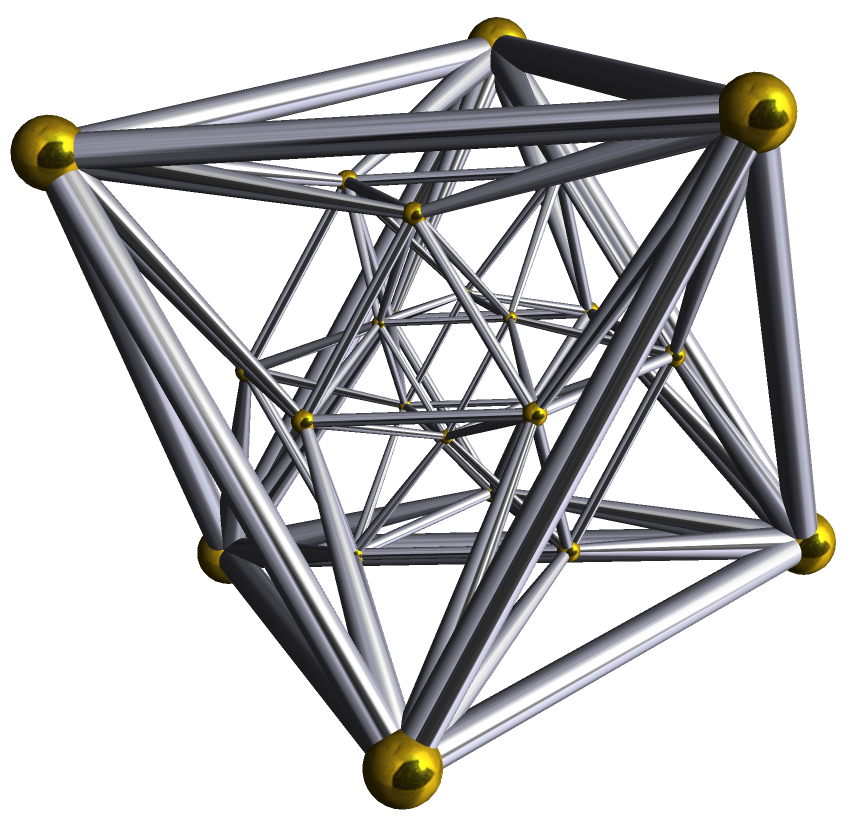
- Schlegel diagram (vertices and edges)
- Type: Convex regular 4-polytope
- Schläfli symbol: {3,4,3} r{3,3,4} = $\left\{\begin{array}{l}3\\3,4\end{array}\right\}$ {3^{1,1,1}} = $\left\{\begin{array}{l}3\\3\\3\end{array}\right\}$
- Coxeter diagram: or or
- Cells: 24 {3,4}
- Faces: 96 {3}
- Edges: 96
- Vertices: 24
- Vertex figure: Cube
- Petrie polygon: dodecagon
- Coxeter group: F_{4}, [3,4,3], order 1152; B_{4}, [4,3,3], order 384; D_{4}, [3^{1,1,1}], order 192
- Dual: Self-dual
- Properties: convex, isogonal, isotoxal, isohedral
- Uniform index: 22

In four-dimensional geometry, the 24-cell is a convex regular 4-polytope, a four-dimensional analogue of a Platonic solid. It is named for the 24 octahedra that form its boundary.

It is also called C_{24}, or the icositetrachoron, octaplex (short for "octahedral complex"), icosatetrahedroid, octacube, hyper-diamond or polyoctahedron, being constructed of octahedral cells.

== Geometric description ==
The 24-cell is a convex four-dimensional polytope boundary, an analogy of nearly the cuboctahedron and its dual the rhombic dodecahedron in four dimensions. It is composed of 24 octahedral cells with six meeting at each vertex, and three at each edge. Together, it has 96 triangular faces, 96 edges, and 24 vertices. Like other four-dimensional regular polytope, 5-cell, the 24-cell is self-dual. The 24-cell and the tesseract are the only convex regular 4-polytopes in which the edge length equals the radius. Its geometry is summarized by its Schläfli symbol, $\{3,4,3\}$, which indicates that its faces are regular 3-gons (triangles), its cells are octahedra (polyhedra with 3-sided faces, 4 of which meet at each vertex), and the vertex figure is a cube (a polyhedron with 4-sided faces, 3 of which meet at each vertex).

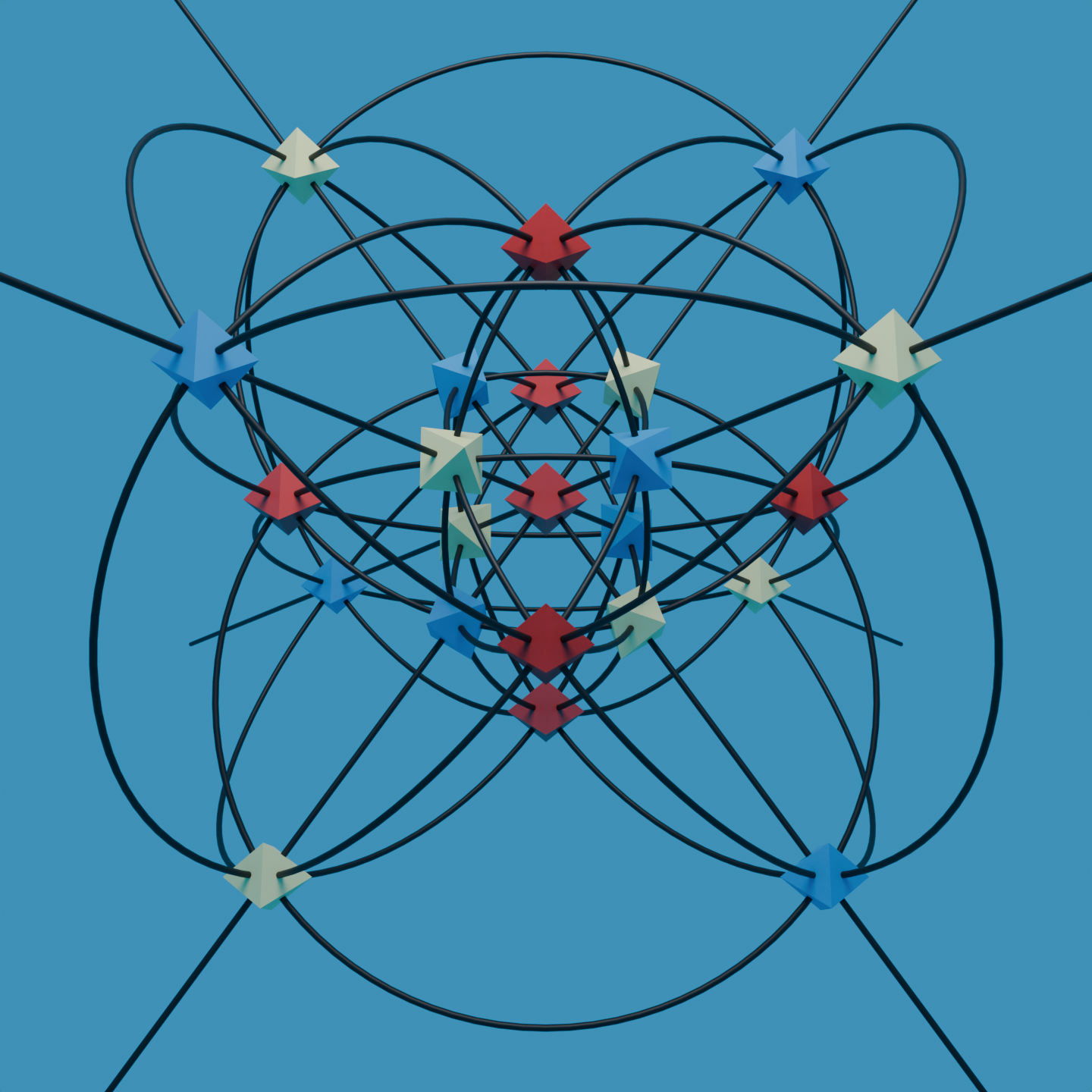
The 24-point 24-cell contains three 8-point 16-cells (red, yellow and blue), double-rotated by 60 degrees with respect to each other

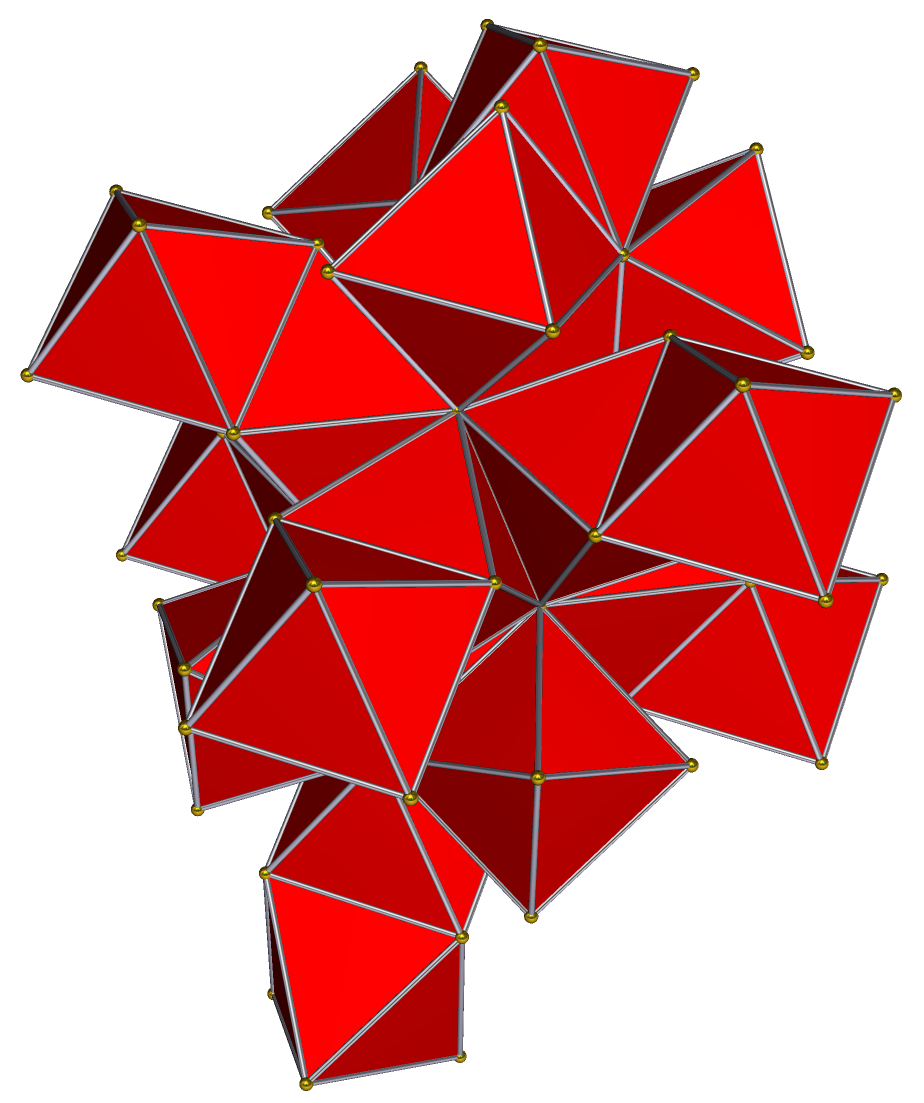
The net of a 24-cell is composed of regular octahedra

The 24-cell incorporates the geometries of every convex regular polytope in the first four dimensions, except the 5-cell, those with a 5 in their Schlӓfli symbol, and the regular polygons with 7 or more sides. In other words, the 24-cell contains all of the regular polytopes made of triangles and squares that exist in four dimensions except the regular 5-cell, but none of the pentagonal polytopes. The geometric relationships among all of these regular polytopes can be observed in a single 24-cell or the 24-cell honeycomb.

The 24-cell is the fourth in the sequence of six convex regular 4-polytopes (in order of size and complexity). The convex regular 4-polytopes can be ordered by size as a measure of 4-dimensional content (hypervolume) for the same radius. This is their proper order of enumeration, the order in which they nest inside each other as compounds. Each greater polytope in the sequence is rounder than its predecessor, enclosing more content within the same radius. The 4-simplex (5-cell) is the limit smallest case, and the 120-cell is the largest. Complexity (as measured by comparing configuration matrices or simply the number of vertices) follows the same ordering. This provides an alternative numerical naming scheme for regular polytopes in which the 24-cell is the 24-point 4-polytope: fourth in the ascending sequence that runs from 5-point 4-polytope to 600-point 4-polytope. It can be deconstructed into 3 overlapping instances of its predecessor the tesseract (8-cell), as the 8-cell can be deconstructed into 2 instances of its predecessor the 16-cell. The reverse procedure to construct each of these from an instance of its predecessor preserves the radius of the predecessor, but generally produces a successor with a smaller edge length.

The 24-cell is the convex hull of its vertices which can be described as the 24 coordinate permutations of:
$$(\pm1, \pm 1, 0, 0) \in \mathbb{R}^4 .$$
Those coordinates can be constructed as the 24-cell, rectifying the 16-cell with the 8 vertices that are permutations of $(\pm 2, 0,0,0)$. The vertex figure of a 16-cell is the octahedron; thus, cutting the vertices of the 16-cell at the midpoint of its incident edges produces 8 octahedral cells. This process also rectifies the tetrahedral cells of the 16-cell which become 16 octahedra, giving the 24-cell 24 octahedral cells.

The 12 axes and 16 hexagons of the 24-cell constitute a Reye configuration, which in the language of configurations is written as 12_{4}16_{3} to indicate that each axis belongs to 4 hexagons, and each hexagon contains 3 axes.

This configuration matrix represents the 24-cell. The rows and columns correspond to vertices, edges, faces, and cells. The diagonal numbers say how many of each element occur in the whole 24-cell. The non-diagonal numbers say how many of the column's element occur in or at the row's element.
$$\begin{bmatrix}
24 & 8 & 12 & 6 \\
2 & 96 & 3 & 3 \\
3 & 3 & 96 & 2 \\
6 & 12 & 8 & 24
\end{bmatrix}.$$

== Root systems ==
The compound of the 24 vertices of the 24-cell (red nodes), and its unscaled dual (yellow nodes), represent the 48 root vectors of the F_{4} group, as shown in this F_{4} Coxeter plane projection

The 24 root vectors of the D_{4} root system of the simple Lie group SO(8) form the vertices of a 24-cell. The vertices can be seen in 3 hyperplanes, with the 6 vertices of an octahedron cell on each of the outer hyperplanes and 12 vertices of a cuboctahedron on a central hyperplane. These vertices, combined with the 8 vertices of the 16-cell, represent the 32 root vectors of the B_{4} and C_{4} simple Lie groups.

The 48 vertices (or strictly speaking their radius vectors) of the union of the 24-cell and its dual form the root system of type F_{4}. The 24 vertices of the original 24-cell form a root system of type D_{4}; its size has the ratio √2:1. This is likewise true for the 24 vertices of its dual. The full symmetry group of the 24-cell is the Weyl group of F_{4}, which is generated by reflections through the hyperplanes orthogonal to the F_{4} roots. This is a solvable group of order 1152. The rotational symmetry group of the 24-cell is of order 576.

=== Quaternionic interpretation ===
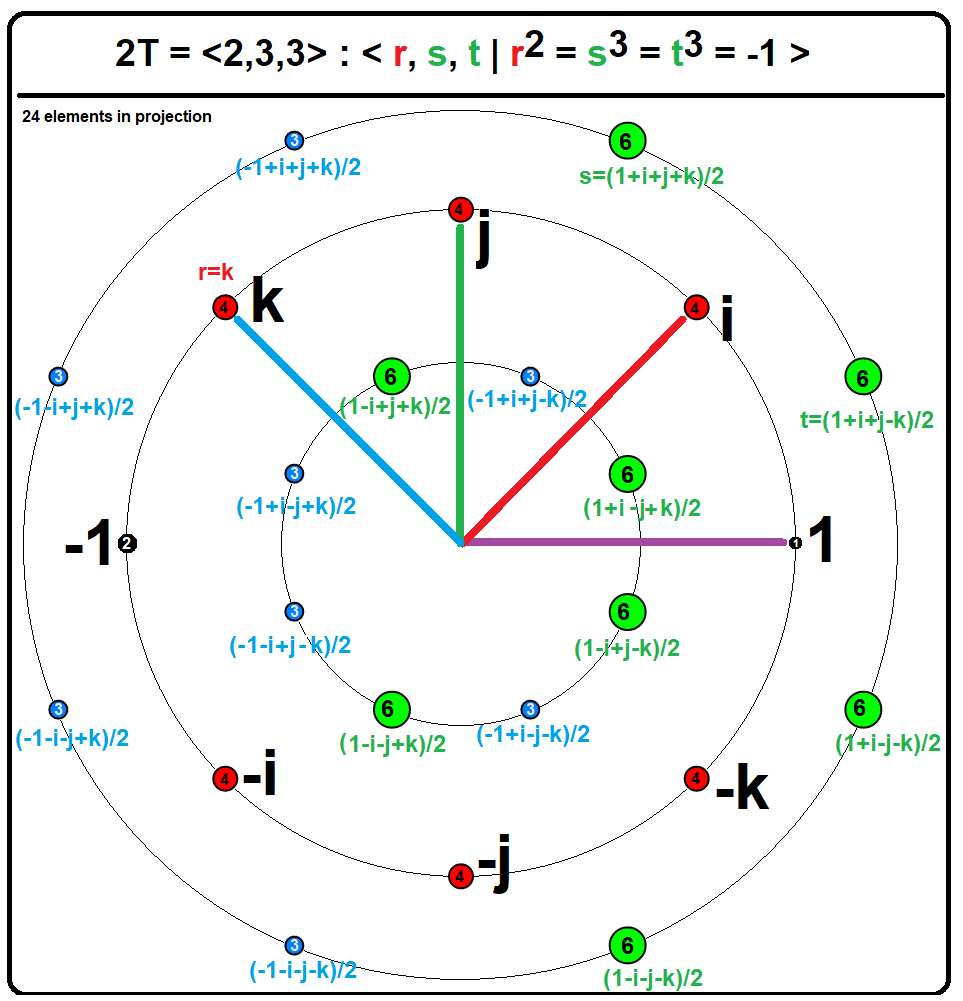
The 24 quaternion elements of the binary tetrahedral group match the vertices of the 24-cell. Seen in 4-fold symmetry projection: * 1 order-1: 1 * 1 order-2: -1 * 6 order-4: ±i, ±j, ±k * 8 order-6: (+1±i±j±k)/2 * 8 order-3: (-1±i±j±k)/2.

When interpreted as the quaternions, the F_{4} root lattice (which is the integral span of the vertices of the 24-cell) is closed under multiplication and is therefore a ring. This is the ring of Hurwitz integral quaternions. The vertices of the 24-cell form the group of units (i.e. the group of invertible elements) in the Hurwitz quaternion ring (this group is also known as the binary tetrahedral group). The vertices of the 24-cell are precisely the 24 Hurwitz quaternions with norm squared 1, and the vertices of the dual 24-cell are those with norm squared 2. The D_{4} root lattice is the dual of the F_{4} and is given by the subring of Hurwitz quaternions with even norm squared.

Viewed as the 24 unit Hurwitz quaternions, the unit radius coordinates of the 24-cell represent (in antipodal pairs) the 12 rotations of a regular tetrahedron.

Vertices of other convex regular 4-polytopes also form multiplicative groups of quaternions, but few of them generate a root lattice.

=== Voronoi cells and tessellation ===
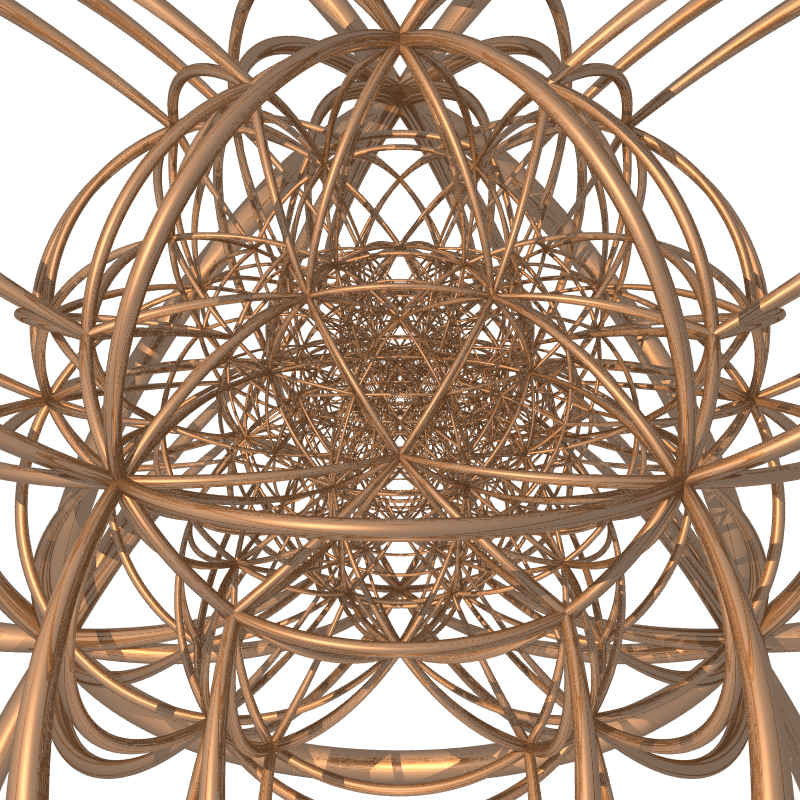
A 24-cell honeycomb

The Voronoi cells of the D_{4} root lattice are regular 24-cells. The corresponding Voronoi tessellation gives the tessellation of four-dimensional Euclidean space by regular 24-cells, the 24-cell honeycomb. As a polytope that can tile by translation, the 24-cell is an example of a parallelotope, the simplest one that is not also a zonotope. The Schläfli symbol for this tessellation is $\{3,4,3,3\}$. It is one of only three regular tessellations of $\mathbb{R}^4$. The 24-cells are centered at the D_{4} lattice points (Hurwitz quaternions with even norm squared) while the vertices are at the F_{4} lattice points with odd norm squared. Each 24-cell of this tessellation has 24 neighbors. With each of these it shares an octahedron. It also has 24 other neighbors with which it shares only a single vertex. Eight 24-cells meet at any given vertex in this tessellation.

The dual tessellation of the 24-cell honeycomb {3,4,3,3} is the 16-cell honeycomb {3,3,4,3}. The third regular tessellation of four dimensional space is the tesseractic honeycomb {4,3,3,4}, whose vertices can be described by 4-integer Cartesian coordinates. The congruent relationships among these three tessellations can be helpful in visualizing the 24-cell, in particular the radial equilateral symmetry which it shares with the tesseract.

== Rotations ==
The regular convex 4-polytopes are an expression of their underlying symmetry which is known as SO(4), the group of rotations about a fixed point in 4-dimensional Euclidean space.

A 3D projection of a 24-cell performing a simple rotation.

A 3D projection of a 24-cell performing a double rotation.

Rotations in 4-dimensional Euclidean space can be seen as the composition of two 2-dimensional rotations in completely orthogonal planes. Thus the general rotation in 4-space is a double rotation. There are two important special cases: a simple rotation (in which one rotational angle is 0) and an isoclinic rotation (similar but not identical to two simple rotations through the same angle).

- In the 24-cell, there is a simple rotation which will take any vertex directly to any other vertex, also moving most of the other vertices but leaving at least 2 and at most 6 other vertices fixed (the vertices that the fixed central plane intersects). The vertex moves along a great circle in the invariant plane of rotation between adjacent vertices of a great hexagon, a great square or a great digon, and the completely orthogonal fixed plane is a digon, a square or a hexagon, respectively.
- Double rotations come in two chiral forms: left and right rotations. In a double rotation each vertex moves in a spiral along two orthogonal great circles at once. Either the path is right-hand threaded (like most screws and bolts), moving along the circles in the "same" directions, or it is left-hand threaded (like a reverse-threaded bolt), moving along the circles in what we conventionally say are "opposite" directions (according to the right hand rule by which we conventionally say which way is "up" on each of the 4 coordinate axes). In double rotations of the 24-cell that take vertices to vertices, one invariant plane of rotation contains either a great hexagon, a great square, or only an axis (two vertices, a great digon). The completely orthogonal invariant plane of rotation will necessarily contain a great digon, a great square, or a great hexagon, respectively. The selection of an invariant plane of rotation, a rotational direction and angle through which to rotate it, and a rotational direction and angle through which to rotate its completely orthogonal plane, completely determines the nature of the rotational displacement. In the 24-cell, there are several noteworthy kinds of double rotation permitted by these parameters.
- When the angles of rotation in the two completely orthogonal invariant planes are exactly the same, a remarkably symmetric transformation occurs: all the great circle planes Clifford parallel to the pair of invariant planes become pairs of invariant planes of rotation themselves, through that same angle, and the 4-polytope rotates isoclinically in many directions at once. Each vertex moves an equal distance in four orthogonal directions at the same time. In the 24-cell any isoclinic rotation through 60 degrees in a hexagonal plane takes each vertex to a vertex two edge lengths away, rotates all 16 hexagons by 60 degrees, and takes every great circle polygon (square, hexagon or triangle) to a Clifford parallel great circle polygon of the same kind 120 degrees away. An isoclinic rotation is also called a Clifford displacement, after its discoverer.

The 24-cell in the double rotation animation appears to turn itself inside out. It appears to, because it actually does, reversing the chirality of the whole 4-polytope just the way your bathroom mirror reverses the chirality of your image by a 180 degree reflection. Each 360 degree isoclinic rotation is as if the 24-cell surface had been stripped off like a glove and turned inside out, making a right-hand glove into a left-hand glove (or vice versa).

=== Characteristic orthoscheme ===
Characteristics of the 24-cell
	edge	arc		dihedral	
𝒍	$1$	60°	$\tfrac{\pi}{3}$	120°	$\tfrac{2\pi}{3}$
𝟀	$\sqrt{\tfrac{1}{3}} \approx 0.577$	45°	$\tfrac{\pi}{4}$	45°	$\tfrac{\pi}{4}$
𝝉	$\sqrt{\tfrac{1}{4}} = 0.5$	30°	$\tfrac{\pi}{6}$	60°	$\tfrac{\pi}{3}$
𝟁	$\sqrt{\tfrac{1}{12}} \approx 0.289$	30°	$\tfrac{\pi}{6}$	60°	$\tfrac{\pi}{3}$
$_0R^3/l$	$\sqrt{\tfrac{1}{2}} \approx 0.707$	45°	$\tfrac{\pi}{4}$	90°	$\tfrac{\pi}{2}$
$_1R^3/l$	$\sqrt{\tfrac{1}{4}} = 0.5$	30°	$\tfrac{\pi}{6}$	90°	$\tfrac{\pi}{2}$
$_2R^3/l$	$\sqrt{\tfrac{1}{6}} \approx 0.408$	30°	$\tfrac{\pi}{6}$	90°	$\tfrac{\pi}{2}$
$_0R^4/l$	$1$				
$_1R^4/l$	$\sqrt{\tfrac{3}{4}} \approx 0.866$				
$_2R^4/l$	$\sqrt{\tfrac{2}{3}} \approx 0.816$				
$_3R^4/l$	$\sqrt{\tfrac{1}{2}} \approx 0.707$				

Every regular 4-polytope has its characteristic 4-orthoscheme, an irregular 5-cell. The characteristic 5-cell of the regular 24-cell is represented by the Coxeter-Dynkin diagram, which can be read as a list of the dihedral angles between its mirror facets. It is an irregular tetrahedral pyramid based on the characteristic tetrahedron of the regular octahedron. The regular 24-cell is subdivided by its symmetry hyperplanes into 1152 instances of its characteristic 5-cell that all meet at its center.

The characteristic 5-cell (4-orthoscheme) has four more edges than its base characteristic tetrahedron (3-orthoscheme), joining the four vertices of the base to its apex (the fifth vertex of the 4-orthoscheme, at the center of the regular 24-cell). If the regular 24-cell has radius and edge length 𝒍 = 1, its characteristic 5-cell's ten edges have lengths $\sqrt{\tfrac{1}{3}}$, $\sqrt{\tfrac{1}{4}}$, $\sqrt{\tfrac{1}{12}}$ around its exterior right-triangle face (the edges opposite the characteristic angles 𝟀, 𝝉, 𝟁), plus $\sqrt{\tfrac{1}{2}}$, $\sqrt{\tfrac{1}{4}}$, $\sqrt{\tfrac{1}{6}}$ (the other three edges of the exterior 3-orthoscheme facet the characteristic tetrahedron, which are the characteristic radii of the octahedron), plus $1$, $\sqrt{\tfrac{3}{4}}$, $\sqrt{\tfrac{2}{3}}$, $\sqrt{\tfrac{1}{2}}$ (edges which are the characteristic radii of the 24-cell). The 4-edge path along orthogonal edges of the orthoscheme is $\sqrt{\tfrac{1}{4}}$, $\sqrt{\tfrac{1}{12}}$, $\sqrt{\tfrac{1}{6}}$, $\sqrt{\tfrac{1}{2}}$, first from a 24-cell vertex to a 24-cell edge center, then turning 90° to a 24-cell face center, then turning 90° to a 24-cell octahedral cell center, then turning 90° to the 24-cell center.

=== Reflections ===
The 24-cell can be constructed by the reflections of its characteristic 5-cell in its own facets (its tetrahedral mirror walls). Reflections and rotations are related: a reflection in an even number of intersecting mirrors is a rotation. Consequently, regular polytopes can be generated by reflections or by rotations. For example, any 720° isoclinic rotation of the 24-cell in a hexagonal invariant plane takes each of the 24 vertices to and through 5 other vertices and back to itself, on a skew hexagram_{2} geodesic isocline that winds twice around the 3-sphere on every second vertex of the hexagram. Any set of four orthogonal pairs of antipodal vertices (the 8 vertices of one of the three inscribed 16-cells) performing half such an orbit visits 3 * 8 = 24 distinct vertices and generates the 24-cell sequentially in 3 steps of a single 360° isoclinic rotation, just as any single characteristic 5-cell reflecting itself in its own mirror walls generates the 24 vertices simultaneously by reflection.

Tracing the orbit of one such 16-cell vertex during the 360° isoclinic rotation reveals more about the relationship between reflections and rotations as generative operations. The vertex follows an isocline (a doubly curved geodesic circle) rather than an ordinary great circle. The isocline connects vertices two edge lengths apart, but curves away from the great circle path over the two edges connecting those vertices, missing the vertex in between. Although the isocline does not follow any one great circle, it is contained within a ring of another kind: in the 24-cell it stays within a 6-cell ring of spherical octahedral cells, intersecting one vertex in each cell, and passing through the volume of two adjacent cells near the missed vertex.

=== Chiral symmetry operations ===
A symmetry operation is a rotation or reflection which leaves the object indistinguishable from itself before the transformation. The 24-cell has 1152 distinct symmetry operations (576 rotations and 576 reflections). Each rotation is equivalent to two reflections, in a distinct pair of non-parallel mirror planes.

Pictured are sets of disjoint great circle polygons, each in a distinct central plane of the 24-cell. For example, {24/4}=4{6} is an orthogonal projection of the 24-cell picturing 4 of its [16] great hexagon planes. The 4 planes lie Clifford parallel to the projection plane and to each other, and their great polygons collectively constitute a discrete Hopf fibration of 4 non-intersecting great circles which visit all 24 vertices just once.

Each row of the table describes a class of distinct rotations. Each rotation class takes the left planes pictured to the corresponding right planes pictured. The vertices of the moving planes move in parallel along the polygonal isocline paths pictured. For example, the $[32]R_{q7,q8}$ rotation class consists of [32] distinct rotational displacements by an arc-distance of 2𝝅/3 = 120° between 16 great hexagon planes represented by quaternion group $q7$ and a corresponding set of 16 great hexagon planes represented by quaternion group $q8$. One of the [32] distinct rotations of this class moves the representative vertex coordinate $(\tfrac{1}{2},\tfrac{1}{2},\tfrac{1}{2},\tfrac{1}{2})$ to the vertex coordinate $(\tfrac{1}{2},-\tfrac{1}{2},-\tfrac{1}{2},-\tfrac{1}{2})$.

Proper rotations of the 24-cell symmetry group F_{4}
Isocline	Rotation class				Left planes $ql$					Right planes $qr$				
{24/8}=4{6/2} $^{q7,q8}$ [16] 4𝝅 {6/2}	$[32]R_{q7,q8}$				{24/4}=4{6} $^{q7}$ [16] 2𝝅 {6}	$(\tfrac{1}{2},\tfrac{1}{2},\tfrac{1}{2},\tfrac{1}{2})$				{24/8}=4{6/2} $^{q8}$ [16] 2𝝅 {6}	$(\tfrac{1}{2},-\tfrac{1}{2},-\tfrac{1}{2},-\tfrac{1}{2})$			
{24/8}=4{6/2} $^{q7,q8}$ [16] 4𝝅 {6/2}	2𝝅/3	120°	√3	1.732~	{24/4}=4{6} $^{q7}$ [16] 2𝝅 {6}	𝝅/3	60°	√1	1	{24/8}=4{6/2} $^{q8}$ [16] 2𝝅 {6}	2𝝅/3	120°	√3	1.732~
{24/2}=2{12} $^{q7,-q8}$ [16] 4𝝅 {12}	$[32]R_{q7,-q8}$				{24/4}=4{6} $^{q7}$ [16] 2𝝅 {6}	$(\tfrac{1}{2},\tfrac{1}{2},\tfrac{1}{2},\tfrac{1}{2})$				{24/4}=4{6} $^{-q8}$ [16] 2𝝅 {6}	$(-\tfrac{1}{2},\tfrac{1}{2},\tfrac{1}{2},\tfrac{1}{2})$			
{24/2}=2{12} $^{q7,-q8}$ [16] 4𝝅 {12}	𝝅/3	60°	√1	1	{24/4}=4{6} $^{q7}$ [16] 2𝝅 {6}	𝝅/3	60°	√1	1	{24/4}=4{6} $^{-q8}$ [16] 2𝝅 {6}	𝝅/3	60°	√1	1
{24/1}={24} $^{q7,q7}$ [16] 4𝝅 {1}	$[32]R_{q7,q7}$				{24/4}=4{6} $^{q7}$ [16] 2𝝅 {6}	$(\tfrac{1}{2},\tfrac{1}{2},\tfrac{1}{2},\tfrac{1}{2})$				{24/4}=4{6} $^{q7}$ [16] 2𝝅 {6}	$(\tfrac{1}{2},\tfrac{1}{2},\tfrac{1}{2},\tfrac{1}{2})$			
{24/1}={24} $^{q7,q7}$ [16] 4𝝅 {1}	2𝝅	360°	√0	0	{24/4}=4{6} $^{q7}$ [16] 2𝝅 {6}	𝝅/3	60°	√1	1	{24/4}=4{6} $^{q7}$ [16] 2𝝅 {6}	𝝅/3	60°	√1	1
{24/12}=12{2} $^{q7,-q7}$ [16] 4𝝅 {2}	$[32]R_{q7,-q7}$				{24/4}=4{6} $^{q7}$ [16] 2𝝅 {6}	$(\tfrac{1}{2},\tfrac{1}{2},\tfrac{1}{2},\tfrac{1}{2})$				{24/8}=4{6/2} $^{-q7}$ [16] 2𝝅 {6}	$(-\tfrac{1}{2},-\tfrac{1}{2},-\tfrac{1}{2},-\tfrac{1}{2})$			
{24/12}=12{2} $^{q7,-q7}$ [16] 4𝝅 {2}	𝝅	180°	√4	2	{24/4}=4{6} $^{q7}$ [16] 2𝝅 {6}	𝝅/3	60°	√1	1	{24/8}=4{6/2} $^{-q7}$ [16] 2𝝅 {6}	2𝝅/3	120°	√3	1.732~
{24/2}=2{12} $^{q7,q1}$ [8] 4𝝅 {12}	$[16]R_{q7,q1}$				{24/4}=4{6} $^{q7}$ [8] 2𝝅 {6}	$(\tfrac{1}{2},\tfrac{1}{2},\tfrac{1}{2},\tfrac{1}{2})$				{24/6}=6{4} $^{q1}$ [8] 2𝝅 {4}	$(1,0,0,0)$			
{24/2}=2{12} $^{q7,q1}$ [8] 4𝝅 {12}	𝝅/3	60°	√1	1	{24/4}=4{6} $^{q7}$ [8] 2𝝅 {6}	𝝅/3	60°	√1	1	{24/6}=6{4} $^{q1}$ [8] 2𝝅 {4}	𝝅/2	90°	√2	1.414~
{24/8}=4{6/2} $^{q7,-q1}$ [8] 4𝝅 {6/2}	$[16]R_{q7,-q1}$				{24/4}=4{6} $^{q7}$ [8] 2𝝅 {6}	$(\tfrac{1}{2},\tfrac{1}{2},\tfrac{1}{2},\tfrac{1}{2})$				{24/6}=6{4} $^{-q1}$ [8] 2𝝅 {4}	$(-1,0,0,0)$			
{24/8}=4{6/2} $^{q7,-q1}$ [8] 4𝝅 {6/2}	2𝝅/3	120°	√3	1.732~	{24/4}=4{6} $^{q7}$ [8] 2𝝅 {6}	𝝅/3	60°	√1	1	{24/6}=6{4} $^{-q1}$ [8] 2𝝅 {4}	𝝅/2	90°	√2	1.414~
{24/1}={24} $^{q6,q6}$ [18] 4𝝅 {1}	$[36]R_{q6,q6}$				{24/6}=6{4} $^{q6}$ [18] 2𝝅 {4}	$(\tfrac{\sqrt{2}}{2},\tfrac{\sqrt{2}}{2},0,0)$				{24/6}=6{4} $^{q6}$ [18] 2𝝅 {4}	$(\tfrac{\sqrt{2}}{2},\tfrac{\sqrt{2}}{2},0,0)$			
{24/1}={24} $^{q6,q6}$ [18] 4𝝅 {1}	2𝝅	360°	√0	0	{24/6}=6{4} $^{q6}$ [18] 2𝝅 {4}	𝝅/2	90°	√2	1.414~	{24/6}=6{4} $^{q6}$ [18] 2𝝅 {4}	𝝅/2	90°	√2	1.414~
{24/12}=12{2} $^{q6,-q6}$ [18] 4𝝅 {2}	$[36]R_{q6,-q6}$				{24/6}=6{4} $^{q6}$ [18] 2𝝅 {4}	$(\tfrac{\sqrt{2}}{2},\tfrac{\sqrt{2}}{2},0,0)$				{24/6}=6{4} $^{-q6}$ [18] 2𝝅 {4}	$(-\tfrac{\sqrt{2}}{2},-\tfrac{\sqrt{2}}{2},0,0)$			
{24/12}=12{2} $^{q6,-q6}$ [18] 4𝝅 {2}	𝝅	180°	√4	2	{24/6}=6{4} $^{q6}$ [18] 2𝝅 {4}	𝝅/2	90°	√2	1.414~	{24/6}=6{4} $^{-q6}$ [18] 2𝝅 {4}	𝝅/2	90°	√2	1.414~
{24/9}=3{8/3} $^{q6,-q4}$ [72] 4𝝅 {8/3}	$[144]R_{q6,-q4}$				{24/6}=6{4} $^{q6}$ [72] 2𝝅 {4}	$(\tfrac{\sqrt{2}}{2},\tfrac{\sqrt{2}}{2},0,0)$				{24/6}=6{4} $^{-q4}$ [72] 2𝝅 {4}	$(0,0,-\tfrac{\sqrt{2}}{2},-\tfrac{\sqrt{2}}{2})$			
{24/9}=3{8/3} $^{q6,-q4}$ [72] 4𝝅 {8/3}	𝝅/2	90°	√2	1.414~	{24/6}=6{4} $^{q6}$ [72] 2𝝅 {4}	𝝅/2	90°	√2	1.414~	{24/6}=6{4} $^{-q4}$ [72] 2𝝅 {4}	𝝅	180°	√4	2
{24/1}={24} $^{q4,q4}$ [36] 4𝝅 {1}	$[72]R_{q4,q4}$				{24/6}=6{4} $^{q4}$ [36] 2𝝅 {4}	$(0,0,\tfrac{\sqrt{2}}{2},\tfrac{\sqrt{2}}{2})$				{24/6}=6{4} $^{q4}$ [36] 2𝝅 {4}	$(0,0,\tfrac{\sqrt{2}}{2},\tfrac{\sqrt{2}}{2})$			
{24/1}={24} $^{q4,q4}$ [36] 4𝝅 {1}	2𝝅	360°	√0	0	{24/6}=6{4} $^{q4}$ [36] 2𝝅 {4}	𝝅/2	90°	√2	1.414~	{24/6}=6{4} $^{q4}$ [36] 2𝝅 {4}	𝝅/2	90°	√2	1.414~
{24/2}=2{12} $^{q2,q7}$ [48] 4𝝅 {12}	$[96]R_{q2,q7}$				{24/6}=6{4} $^{q2}$ [48] 2𝝅 {4}	$(0,0,0,1)$				{24/4}=4{6} $^{q7}$ [48] 2𝝅 {6}	$(\tfrac{1}{2},\tfrac{1}{2},\tfrac{1}{2},\tfrac{1}{2})$			
{24/2}=2{12} $^{q2,q7}$ [48] 4𝝅 {12}	𝝅/3	60°	√1	1	{24/6}=6{4} $^{q2}$ [48] 2𝝅 {4}	𝝅/2	90°	√2	1.414~	{24/4}=4{6} $^{q7}$ [48] 2𝝅 {6}	𝝅/3	60°	√1	1
{24/12}=12{2} $^{q2,-q2}$ [9] 4𝝅 {2}	$[18]R_{q2,-q2}$				{24/6}=6{4} $^{q2}$ [9] 2𝝅 {4}	$(0,0,0,1)$				{24/6}=6{4} $^{-q2}$ [9] 2𝝅 {4}	$(0,0,0,-1)$			
{24/12}=12{2} $^{q2,-q2}$ [9] 4𝝅 {2}	𝝅	180°	√4	2	{24/6}=6{4} $^{q2}$ [9] 2𝝅 {4}	𝝅/2	90°	√2	1.414~	{24/6}=6{4} $^{-q2}$ [9] 2𝝅 {4}	𝝅/2	90°	√2	1.414~
{24/12}=12{2} $^{q2,q1}$ [12] 4𝝅 {2}	$[12]R_{q2,q1}$				{24/12}=12{2} $^{q2}$ [12] 2𝝅 {2}	$(0,0,0,1)$				{24/12}=12{2} $^{q1}$ [12] 2𝝅 {2}	$(1,0,0,0)$			
{24/12}=12{2} $^{q2,q1}$ [12] 4𝝅 {2}	𝝅/2	90°	√2	1.414~	{24/12}=12{2} $^{q2}$ [12] 2𝝅 {2}	𝝅/2	90°	√2	1.414~	{24/12}=12{2} $^{q1}$ [12] 2𝝅 {2}	𝝅/2	90°	√2	1.414~
{24/1}={24} $^{q1,q1}$ [0] 0𝝅 {1}	$[1]R_{q1,q1}$				{24/12}=12{2} $^{q1}$ [0] 2𝝅 {2}	$(1,0,0,0)$				{24/12}=12{2} $^{q1}$ [0] 2𝝅 {2}	$(1,0,0,0)$			
{24/1}={24} $^{q1,q1}$ [0] 0𝝅 {1}	0	0°	√0	0	{24/12}=12{2} $^{q1}$ [0] 2𝝅 {2}	𝝅/2	90°	√2	1.414~	{24/12}=12{2} $^{q1}$ [0] 2𝝅 {2}	𝝅/2	90°	√2	1.414~
{24/12}=12{2} $^{q1,-q1}$ [12] 2𝝅 {2}	$[1]R_{q1,-q1}$				{24/12}=12{2} $^{q1}$ [12] 2𝝅 {2}	$(1,0,0,0)$				{24/12}=12{2} $^{-q1}$ [12] 2𝝅 {2}	$(-1,0,0,0)$			
{24/12}=12{2} $^{q1,-q1}$ [12] 2𝝅 {2}	𝝅	180°	√4	2	{24/12}=12{2} $^{q1}$ [12] 2𝝅 {2}	𝝅/2	90°	√2	1.414~	{24/12}=12{2} $^{-q1}$ [12] 2𝝅 {2}	𝝅/2	90°	√2	1.414~

In a rotation class $[d]{R_{ql,qr}}$ each quaternion group $\pm{q_n}$ may be representative not only of its own fibration of Clifford parallel planes but also of the other congruent fibrations. For example, rotation class $[4]R_{q7,q8}$ takes the 4 hexagon planes of $q7$ to the 4 hexagon planes of $q8$ which are 120° away, in an isoclinic rotation. But in a rigid rotation of this kind, all [16] hexagon planes move in congruent rotational displacements, so this rotation class also includes $[4]R_{-q7,-q8}$, $[4]R_{q8,q7}$ and $[4]R_{-q8,-q7}$. The name $[16]R_{q7,q8}$ is the conventional representation for all [16] congruent plane displacements.

These rotation classes are all subclasses of $[32]R_{q7,q8}$ which has [32] distinct rotational displacements rather than [16] because there are two chiral ways to perform any class of rotations, designated its left rotations and its right rotations. The [16] left displacements of this class are not congruent with the [16] right displacements, but enantiomorphous like a pair of shoes. Each left (or right) isoclinic rotation takes [16] left planes to [16] right planes, but the left and right planes correspond differently in the left and right rotations. The left and right rotational displacements of the same left plane take it to different right planes.

Each rotation class (table row) describes a distinct left (and right) isoclinic rotation. The left (or right) rotations carry the left planes to the right planes simultaneously, through a characteristic rotation angle. For example, the $[32]R_{q7,q8}$ rotation moves all [16] hexagonal planes at once by 2𝝅/3 = 120° each. Repeated 6 times, this left (or right) isoclinic rotation moves each plane 720° and back to itself in the same orientation, passing through all 4 planes of the $q7$ left set and all 4 planes of the $q8$ right set once each. The picture in the isocline column represents this union of the left and right plane sets. In the $[32]R_{q7,q8}$ example it can be seen as a set of 4 Clifford parallel skew hexagrams, each having one edge in each great hexagon plane, and skewing to the left (or right) at each vertex throughout the left (or right) isoclinic rotation.

== Visualization ==
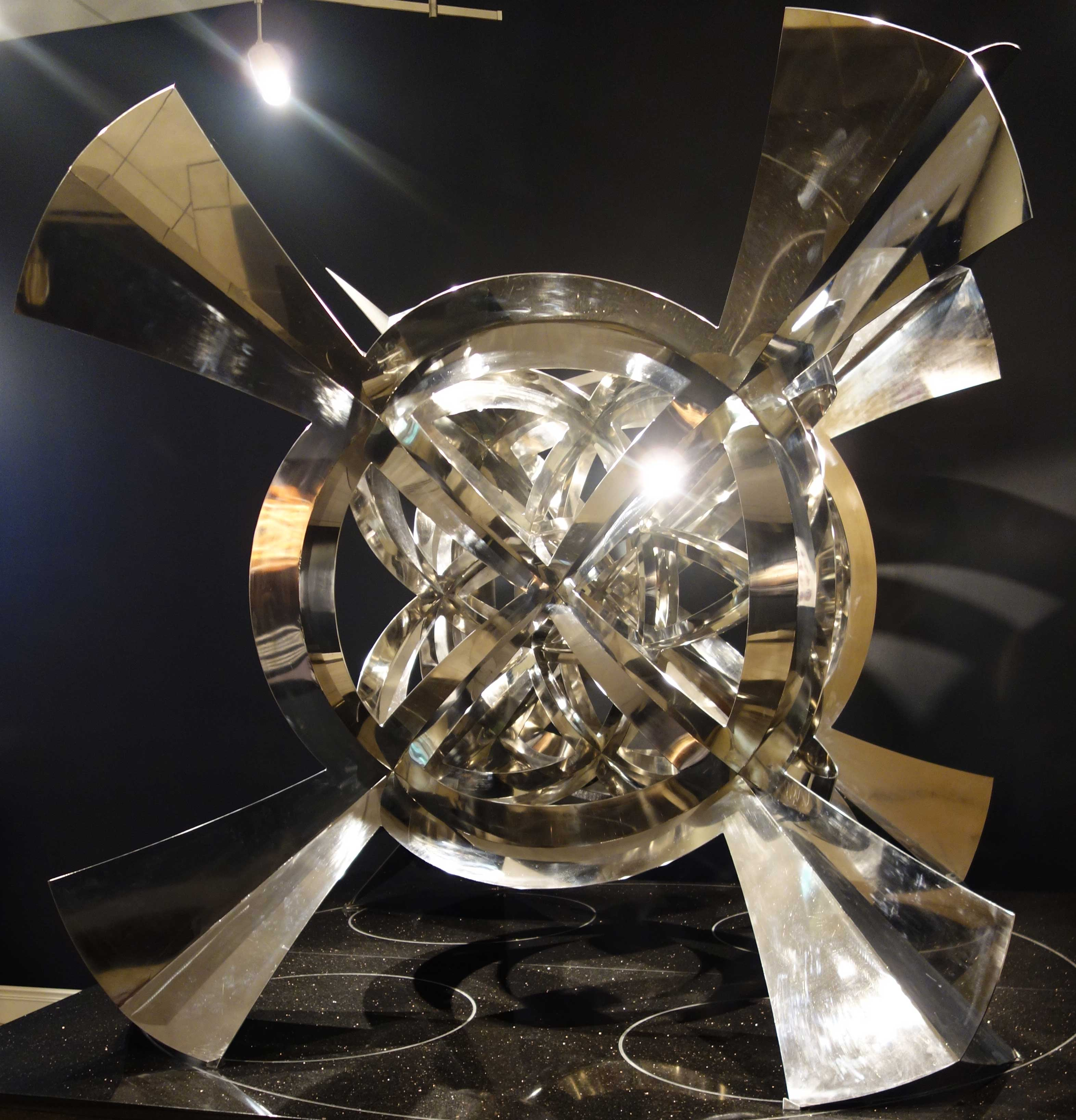
Octacube steel sculpture at Pennsylvania State University

=== Cell rings ===
The 24-cell is bounded by 24 octahedral cells. For visualization purposes, it is convenient that the octahedron has opposing parallel faces (a trait it shares with the cells of the tesseract and the 120-cell). One can stack octahedrons face to face in a straight line bent in the 4th direction into a great circle with a circumference of 6 cells. The cell locations lend themselves to a hyperspherical description. Pick an arbitrary cell and label it the "North Pole". Eight great circle meridians (two cells long) radiate out in 3 dimensions, converging at the 3rd "South Pole" cell. This skeleton accounts for 18 of the 24 cells (2 + 8×2). See the table below.

For the 3-sphere version of the 24-cell (which has the same vertices), the 8 cells in the first layer are obtained by reflecting (using spherical geometry) the north pole cell around its 8 faces, and the 6 equatorial cells (each symmetric under reflection around the equator) are obtained by reflecting the north pole cell (equivalently the south pole cell) around its 6 vertices.

Layer #	Number of Cells	Description	Colatitude (center and range)	Region
1	1 cell	North Pole	0° (0° - 45°)	Northern Hemisphere
2	8 cells	First layer of meridian cells	60° (30° - 90°)	Northern Hemisphere
3	6 cells	Non-meridian / interstitial	90° (45° - 135°)	Equator
4	8 cells	Second layer of meridian cells	120° (90° - 150°)	Southern Hemisphere
5	1 cell	South Pole	180° (135° - 180°)	Southern Hemisphere
Total	24 cells			

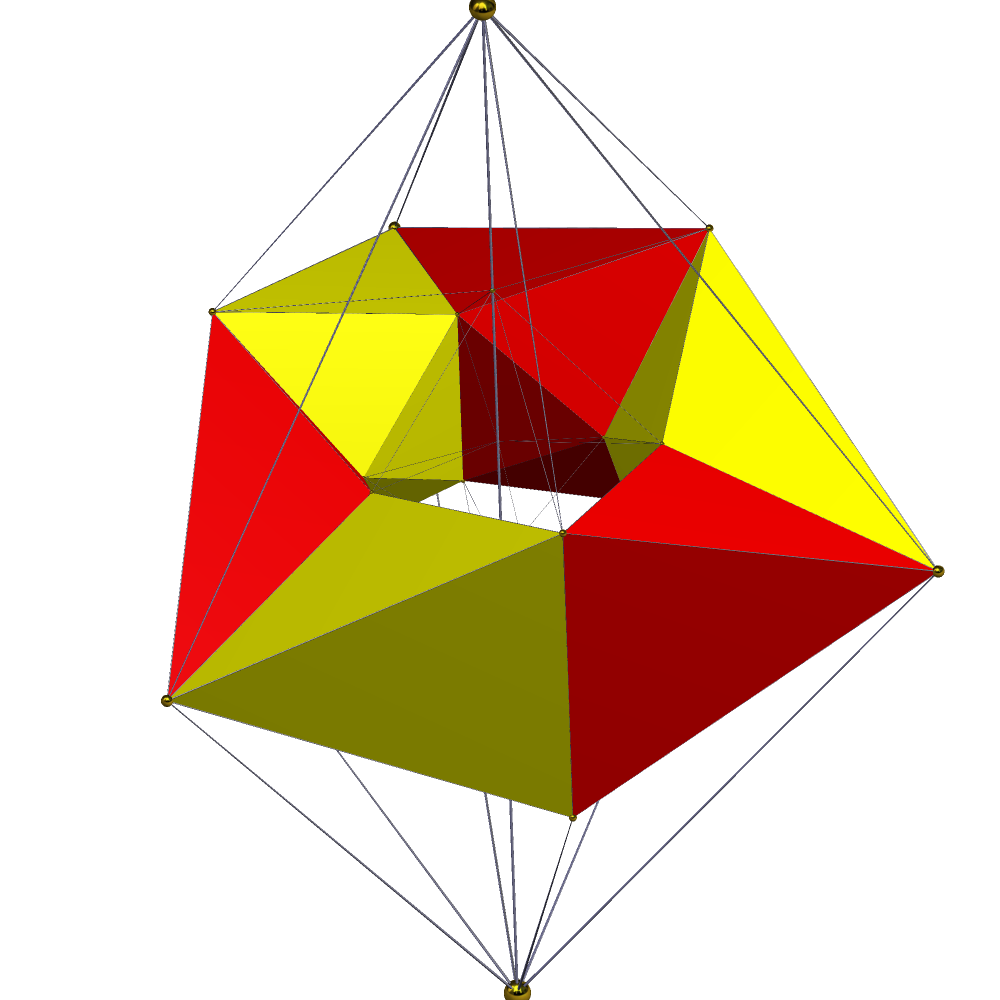
An edge-center perspective projection, showing one of four rings of 6 octahedra around the equator

The 24-cell can be partitioned into cell-disjoint sets of four of these 6-cell great circle rings, forming a discrete Hopf fibration of four non-intersecting linked rings. One ring is "vertical", encompassing the pole cells and four meridian cells. The other three rings each encompass two equatorial cells and four meridian cells, two from the northern hemisphere and two from the southern.

== Related polytopes ==
The regular complex polygon _{4}{3}_{4}, or contains the 24 vertices of the 24-cell, and 24 4-edges that correspond to central squares of 24 of 48 octahedral cells. Its symmetry is _{4}[3]_{4}, order 96.

The following are some polytopes constructed from the 24-cell.

24-cell family polytopes
Name	24-cell	truncated 24-cell	snub 24-cell	rectified 24-cell	cantellated 24-cell	bitruncated 24-cell	cantitruncated 24-cell	runcinated 24-cell	runcitruncated 24-cell	omnitruncated 24-cell
Schläfli symbol	{3,4,3}	t_{0,1}{3,4,3} t{3,4,3}	s{3,4,3}	t_{1}{3,4,3} r{3,4,3}	t_{0,2}{3,4,3} rr{3,4,3}	t_{1,2}{3,4,3} 2t{3,4,3}	t_{0,1,2}{3,4,3} tr{3,4,3}	t_{0,3}{3,4,3}	t_{0,1,3}{3,4,3}	t_{0,1,2,3}{3,4,3}
Coxeter diagram										
Schlegel diagram										
F_{4}										
B_{4}										
B_{3}(a)										
B_{3}(b)										
B_{2}										

The 24-cell can also be derived as a rectified 16-cell:

B4 symmetry polytopes
Name	tesseract	rectified tesseract	truncated tesseract	cantellated tesseract	runcinated tesseract	bitruncated tesseract	cantitruncated tesseract	runcitruncated tesseract	omnitruncated tesseract
Coxeter diagram		=				=			
Schläfli symbol	{4,3,3}	t_{1}{4,3,3} r{4,3,3}	t_{0,1}{4,3,3} t{4,3,3}	t_{0,2}{4,3,3} rr{4,3,3}	t_{0,3}{4,3,3}	t_{1,2}{4,3,3} 2t{4,3,3}	t_{0,1,2}{4,3,3} tr{4,3,3}	t_{0,1,3}{4,3,3}	t_{0,1,2,3}{4,3,3}
Schlegel diagram									
B_{4}									
Name	16-cell	rectified 16-cell	truncated 16-cell	cantellated 16-cell	runcinated 16-cell	bitruncated 16-cell	cantitruncated 16-cell	runcitruncated 16-cell	omnitruncated 16-cell
Coxeter diagram	=	=	=	=		=	=		
Schläfli symbol	{3,3,4}	t_{1}{3,3,4} r{3,3,4}	t_{0,1}{3,3,4} t{3,3,4}	t_{0,2}{3,3,4} rr{3,3,4}	t_{0,3}{3,3,4}	t_{1,2}{3,3,4} 2t{3,3,4}	t_{0,1,2}{3,3,4} tr{3,3,4}	t_{0,1,3}{3,3,4}	t_{0,1,2,3}{3,3,4}
Schlegel diagram									
B_{4}									

== See also ==
- Octacube (sculpture)
- Uniform 4-polytope § The F4 family

== Citations ==
Fundamental convex regular and uniform polytopes
Family	A_{n}	B_{n}	I_{2}(p) / D_{n}	E_{6} / E_{7} / E_{8} / F_{4} / G_{2}	H_{n}
Regular polygon	Triangle	Square	p-gon	Hexagon	Pentagon
Uniform polyhedron	Tetrahedron	Octahedron • Cube	Demicube		Dodecahedron • Icosahedron
Uniform polychoron	Pentachoron	16-cell • Tesseract	Demitesseract	24-cell	120-cell • 600-cell
Uniform 5-polytope	5-simplex	5-orthoplex • 5-cube	5-demicube		
Uniform 6-polytope	6-simplex	6-orthoplex • 6-cube	6-demicube	1_{22} • 2_{21}	
Uniform 7-polytope	7-simplex	7-orthoplex • 7-cube	7-demicube	1_{32} • 2_{31} • 3_{21}	
Uniform 8-polytope	8-simplex	8-orthoplex • 8-cube	8-demicube	1_{42} • 2_{41} • 4_{21}	
Uniform n-polytope	n-simplex	n-orthoplex • n-cube	n-demicube	1_{k2} • 2_{k1} • k_{21}	n-pentagonal polytope
Topics: Polytope families • Regular polytope • List of regular polytopes and compounds • Polytope operations
